

8001–8100 

|-
| 8001 Ramsden ||  || Jesse Ramsden (1735–1800) was the British designer and producer of highly accurate sextants, theodolites and other instruments. Piazzi discovered  using the Ramsden vertical circle of the Palermo Observatory. The name was suggested by J. Ticha on seeing this instrument during the Asteroids 2001 conference. || 
|-id=002
| 8002 Tonyevans ||  || Anthony Evans (born 1944) is an English amateur astronomer involved in tracking Near-Earth Asteroids. He established the "A-Team" of asteroid- and comet-tracking enthusiasts, using robotic telescopes, providing tutorials and assistance to those interested in submitting observations to the MPC. || 
|-id=003
| 8003 Kelvin || 1987 RJ || William Thomson, 1st Baron Kelvin (Lord Kelin; 1824–1907), Scots-Irish physicist || 
|-id=005
| 8005 Albinadubois || 1988 MJ || Albina du Boisrouvray (born 1941), French philanthropist || 
|-id=006
| 8006 Tacchini || 1988 QU || Pietro Tacchini (1838–1905), Italian astronomer, founder of the Italian Society of Spectroscopists, the forerunner of the Societá Astronomica Italiana (Italian Astronomical Society) || 
|-id=009
| 8009 Béguin ||  || The word Béguin, or "flirtation" in English, gives rise to the vigorous dance of the French West Indies, the beguine. || 
|-id=010
| 8010 Böhnhardt ||  || Hermann Böhnhardt (born 1955), German astronomer at ESO || 
|-id=011
| 8011 Saijokeiichi ||  || Keiichi Saijo (born 1949), curator of the astronomy section of National Science Museum, Tokyo. || 
|-id=013
| 8013 Gordonmoore || 1990 KA || Gordon Moore (born 1929), American physicist, businessman and co-founder of Intel || 
|-id=019
| 8019 Karachkina ||  || Lyudmila Karachkina (born 1948), Ukrainian astronomer, wife of Yurii Vasilievich Karachkin, physics teacher, after whom 8089 Yukar was named. || 
|-id=020
| 8020 Erzgebirge ||  || The Ore Mountains (Erzgebirge) of Saxony and Bohemia † || 
|-id=021
| 8021 Walter ||  || Walter Anderson (born 1944) is a long-time editor of Parade, a magazine that reaches more than 80 million readers weekly. || 
|-id=022
| 8022 Scottcrossfield ||  || Albert Scott Crossfield (1921–2006), a test pilot who was the first X-15 pilot and made a total of 14 flights. In 1953 Crossfield was the first pilot to exceed Mach 2 in the D-558-II Skyrocket. While an NACA research pilot, he made a total of 87 flights in the rocket-powered X-1 and D-558-II research aircraft || 
|-id=023
| 8023 Josephwalker || 1991 DD || Joseph A. Walker (1921–1966), a NASA research pilot who was the second pilot to fly the X-15 and made a total of 25 flights. Three of these flights entered space and he received NASA astronaut wings posthumously in 2005. || 
|-id=024
| 8024 Robertwhite || 1991 FN || Robert Michael White (1924–2010), an Air Force test pilot who was the third pilot to fly the X-15 and made a total of 16 flights. He was the first pilot to fly Mach 4, Mach 5 and Mach 6, and the first to fly a winged vehicle into space. White received Air Force astronaut wings for the flight. || 
|-id=025
| 8025 Forrestpeterson ||  || Forrest S. Petersen (1922–1990), a Navy test pilot who was the 4th pilot, and the only Navy pilot, to fly the X-15 and made a total of five flights. || 
|-id=026
| 8026 Johnmckay ||  || John B. McKay (1922–1975), a NASA research pilot who was the 5th pilot to fly the X-15 and made a total of 29 flights. Before joining the X-15 program, he made 46 flights in the X-1 and D-558-II Skyrocket. In 2005 McKay received posthumous NASA astronaut wings for a flight that reached an altitude of 89900 metres. || 
|-id=027
| 8027 Robertrushworth ||  || Robert A. Rushworth (1924–1993), an Air Force test pilot who was the 6th pilot to fly the X-15 and made a total of 34 flights. One of these flights reached 86800 meters, for which Rushworth received Air Force astronaut wings. || 
|-id=028
| 8028 Joeengle || 1991 QE || Joe Engle (born 1932), an Air Force test pilot who was the 8th pilot to fly the X-15 and made a total of 16 flights. He received Air Force astronaut wings for a flight that took him to 85500 meters. Engle also flew the Space Shuttle, becoming the only person who reached space before being selected as an astronaut. || 
|-id=029
| 8029 Miltthompson ||  || Milton Orville Thompson (1926–1993), a NASA research pilot who was the 9th pilot to fly the X-15 and made a total of 14 flights. He subsequently made the first flights of the M2-F1 and M2-F2 lifting bodies, which were the forerunners of the Space Shuttle. || 
|-id=030
| 8030 Williamknight || 1991 SK || William J. Knight (1929–2004), an Air Force test pilot who was the 10th pilot to fly the X-15 and made a total of 16 flights. These included the fastest X-15 flight, which reached Mach 6.7, and another flight to 69600 meters for which he received astronaut wings. || 
|-id=031
| 8031 Williamdana || 1992 ER || William H. Dana (1930–2014), a NASA research pilot who was the 11th pilot to fly the X-15 and made a total of 16 flights. These included a 1967 flight to 93500 meters and he received NASA astronaut wings in 2005. Dana made the 199th and final X-15 flight in 1968 and subsequently flew the M2-F3 and HL-10 lifting bodies. || 
|-id=032
| 8032 Michaeladams ||  || Michael J. Adams (1930–1967), an Air Force test pilot who was the 12th pilot to fly the X-15 and made seven flights. On 1967 Nov. 15, he was killed when his X-15 broke up during reentry. The first American to die in the course of a spaceflight, Adams was awarded posthumous Air Force astronaut wings. || 
|-id=034
| 8034 Akka || 1992 LR || Akka, the Finnish earth mother and goddess of the harvest and female sexuality. || 
|-id=036
| 8036 Maehara ||  || Hideo Maehara (born 1940), professor of the National Astronomical Observatory of Japan and director of the Okayama Astrophysical Observatory || 
|-id=039
| 8039 Grandprism ||  || The Grand Prism Objectiv-40 cm astrograph (GPO), used without prism, has served for many years for searching for minor planets at La Silla.  || 
|-id=040
| 8040 Utsumikazuhiko ||  || Kazuhiko Utsumi (born 1937), made the first identification of many of the spectral lines and determined element abundances for carbon stars. At Hiroshima University he has taught astronomy and astrophysics to more than 30~000 students. || 
|-id=041
| 8041 Masumoto ||  || Takeji Masumoto, builder of the discoverer's observatory. || 
|-id=043
| 8043 Fukuhara ||  || Naohito Fukuhara (born 1965), a computer engineer and amateur astronomer. || 
|-id=044
| 8044 Tsuchiyama || 1994 YT || Yukiko Tsuchiyama (born 1963), a Japanese amateur variable star observer who studies star names as a hobby. || 
|-id=045
| 8045 Kamiyama || 1995 AW || Haruki Kamiyama (born 1960), an amateur astronomer and computer programmer. || 
|-id=046
| 8046 Ajiki || 1995 BU || Osamu Ajiki (born 1965), an amateur astronomer and computer programmer, contributed to the popularization of astronomy by developing a wide variety of astronomical software that is regularly used by astronomers around the world. || 
|-id=047
| 8047 Akikinoshita ||  || Akihiko Kinoshita (born 1963), an amateur astronomer and editor. || 
|-id=048
| 8048 Andrle ||  || Pavel Andrle (1936–1991), Czech astronomer || 
|-id=050
| 8050 Beishida || 1996 ST || Beishida, the Beijing Normal University, is one of the earliest well-known Chinese universities. Founded in 1902, it is an important center for scientific research and the training of excellent teachers and other professionals. || 
|-id=051
| 8051 Pistoria ||  || Pistoia, Italy || 
|-id=052
| 8052 Novalis || 2093 P-L || Novalis (1772–1801), poet and philosopher of Early German Romanticism || 
|-id=053
| 8053 Kleist || 4082 P-L || Heinrich von Kleist (1777–1811), a German poet and dramatist || 
|-id=054
| 8054 Brentano || 4581 P-L || Clemens Brentano (1778–1842), a German novelist and poet of German Romanticism || 
|-id=055
| 8055 Arnim || 5004 P-L || Ludwig Achim von Arnim (1781–1831), a German novelist and poet of German Romanticism || 
|-id=056
| 8056 Tieck || 6038 P-L || Ludwig Tieck (1773–1853), a German novelist, translator and poet of German Romanticism || 
|-id=057
| 8057 Hofmannsthal || 4034 T-1 || Hugo von Hofmannsthal (1874–1929) began writing poems at the age of 16. His lyrical and dramatic work reflects Austrian impressionism and symbolism. Together with Richard Strauss and Max Reinhardt, he founded the Salzburger Festspiele. His best-known play is Jedermann. || 
|-id=058
| 8058 Zuckmayer || 3241 T-3 || Carl Zuckmayer (1896–1977), a German writer and playwright || 
|-id=059
| 8059 Deliyannis || 1957 JP || Constantine Deliyannis (born 1959), on the faculty of Indiana University, has studied the evolution of solar-type stars through his investigations of the abundance of lithium and beryllium in star clusters. He has also made an observational verification of the roles of mixing and diffusion in the evolution of stars. || 
|-id=060
| 8060 Anius ||  || Anius, son and priest to Apollo on the isle of Delos. || 
|-id=061
| 8061 Gaudium || 1975 UF || Latin for joy, pleasure and delight, Gaudium is designed to compensate the gloom of (5708) Melancholia. || 
|-id=062
| 8062 Okhotsymskij || 1977 EZ || Dmitrij Evgenievich Okhotsymskij (born 1921), a specialist in theoretical and applied mechanics. || 
|-id=063
| 8063 Cristinathomas ||  || Cristina A. Thomas (born 1982), a postdoctoral research scientist at Northern Arizona University. || 
|-id=064
| 8064 Lisitsa || 1978 RR || Physicist Mikhail Pavlovich Lisitsa (born 1921) is a professor at Kiev University. || 
|-id=065
| 8065 Nakhodkin ||  || Nikolaj Grigorievich Nakhodkin (born 1925), a faculty head at Kiev University. || 
|-id=066
| 8066 Poldimeri ||  || Leopold Bausbek (born 1938) and Meri Bausbek (born 1945), astronomy enthusiasts and friends of Danish discoverer Richard Martin West || 
|-id=067
| 8067 Helfenstein || 1980 RU || Paul Helfenstein (born 1954), American astronomer of Cornell University || 
|-id=068
| 8068 Vishnureddy ||  || Vishnu Vardhan Reddy (born 1978), a research professor at the University of North Dakota and a visiting scientist at the Max Planck Institute for Solar System Research || 
|-id=069
| 8069 Benweiss ||  || Benjamin P. Weiss (born 1973), a professor of planetary Science at MIT. || 
|-id=070
| 8070 DeMeo ||  || Francesca DeMeo (born 1984), a postdoctoral researcher at MIT who completed her 2010 Ph.D. thesis at the Paris Observatory. An expert in spectral studies of small bodies, she extended to near-infrared wavelengths a taxonomic classification system for minor planets, known as the Bus–DeMeo taxonomy. || 
|-id=071
| 8071 Simonelli || 1981 GO || Damon Paul Simonelli (born 1959), American astronomer and planetary scientist at Cornell University || 
|-id=072
| 8072 Yojikondo ||  || Yoji Kondo (born 1933), Japanese-born U.S. astrophysicist. || 
|-id=073
| 8073 Johnharmon || 1982 BS || John K. Harmon (born 1948), scientist at Arecibo Observatory || 
|-id=074
| 8074 Slade ||  || Martin A. Slade (born 1942), scientist at the Jet Propulsion Laboratory || 
|-id=075
| 8075 Roero || 1985 PE || Roero, the region in Piemont, Italy || 
|-id=076
| 8076 Foscarini ||  || Paolo Antonio Foscarini (1565–1616), an Italian Carmelite father, philosopher and scientist. || 
|-id=077
| 8077 Hoyle ||  || Fred Hoyle (1915–2001) English astronomer, known for the theory of stellar nucleosynthesis and his rejection of the "Big Bang". He served as president of the Royal Astronomical Society from 1971 to 1973. || 
|-id=078
| 8078 Carolejordan ||  || Carole Jordan, professor of physics at Somerville College, Oxford University. || 
|-id=079
| 8079 Bernardlovell ||  || Sir Bernard Lovell (born 1913) founded Jodrell Bank Observatory, which boasts the world's first large steerable radio telescope. Lovell served as president of the Royal Astronomical Society from 1969 to 1971. || 
|-id=080
| 8080 Intel ||  || The Intel 8080 microprocessor is the ancestor of a series of microprocessor chips going from the 8086, 8088, 80286, 80386, 80486 to today's Pentium processors. Fundamental to the "PC revolution", the 8080 did much to advance astronomy at amateur and professional observatories worldwide. || 
|-id=081
| 8081 Leopardi || 1988 DD || Giacomo Leopardi (1798–1837), Italian poet and prose writer || 
|-id=082
| 8082 Haynes || 1988 NR || Norman R. Haynes (born 1936) spent a 41-year career in the leadership of planetary exploration. He worked at the Jet Propulsion Laboratory and served as Voyager Project Manager, Systems Division Manager, Director for Telecommunications and Mission Operations and Director for Mars Exploration. || 
|-id=083
| 8083 Mayeda || 1988 VB || Shizuo (Haruhisa) Mayeda (1914–1952), Japanese amateur astronomer || 
|-id=084
| 8084 Dallas ||  || Dallas, a major city in the U.S. state of Texas || 
|-id=086
| 8086 Peterthomas ||  || Peter Chew Thomas (born 1946), American astronomer † || 
|-id=087
| 8087 Kazutaka ||  || Kazutaka Kato (born 1949), director of the Hiroshima City Planetarium. || 
|-id=088
| 8088 Australia ||  || Australia, the continent in the Southern Hemisphere || 
|-id=089
| 8089 Yukar ||  || Yurii Vasil'evich Karachkin (born 1940), physics teacher at the school attached to the Crimean Astrophysical Observatory. Yurii is the husband of astronomer Lyudmila Georgievna Karachkina, after whom 8019 Karachkina is named || 
|-id=096
| 8096 Emilezola ||  || Émile Zola (1840–1902), French writer || 
|-id=097
| 8097 Yamanishi || 1993 RE || Masahiro Yamanishi (born 1960), senior researcher at Saji Observatory || 
|-id=098
| 8098 Miyamotoatsushi ||  || Atsushi Miyamoto (born 1961), senior researcher at Saji Observatory and a board member of the Tottori Society of Astronomy. || 
|-id=099
| 8099 Okudoiyoshimi || 1993 TE || Yoshimi Okudoi (born 1992) is a member of the Matsue Astronomy Club. She is an architect and has written a paper "Observation Room Features and Problems of Public Observatories in Japan". || 
|-id=100
| 8100 Nobeyama || 1993 XF || Nobeyama, a village in central Japan || 
|}

8101–8200 

|-
| 8101 Yasue ||  || Kunio Yasue (born 1951), director of the Science Laboratory at Okayama Seishin University, has studied mathematical physics and quantum field theory. One of his major contributions to astronomy is his work on spontaneous symmetry breaking at an early stage of the universe's evolution || 
|-id=102
| 8102 Yoshikazu ||  || Yoshikazu Kato (born 1962) is a Japanese amateur astronomer. He edits an e-mail newsletter on astronomy that is sent every week to over 4500 readers, helping to make popularize astronomical knowledge || 
|-id=103
| 8103 Fermi || 1994 BE || Enrico Fermi (1901–1954), Italian physicist and 1938 Nobel Prize laureate || 
|-id=104
| 8104 Kumamori ||  || Teruaki Kumamori (born 1949), planetarium educator of Sakai City Culture Center, Osaka, is an expert in telescope making and has made Wright-Väisälä, Dall-Kirkham, Schiefspiegler and other optics in addition to mechanical parts for them. He also takes high-resolution digital movies of the planets || 
|-id=106
| 8106 Carpino || 1994 YB || Mario Carpino (born 1957), an Italian astronomer at the Brera Astronomical Observatory in Milan. From his initial studies of satellite geodesy, he acquired a taste for extreme accuracy in orbit determination, applying these skills to the study of the dynamics of solar-system bodies in projects such as LONGSTOP and SPACEGUARD. When the Spaceguard Foundation was established in Rome in 1996 he became its secretary (Src). || 
|-id=108
| 8108 Wieland ||  || Christoph Martin Wieland (1733–1813), German poet of the Rococo period and German Enlightenment || 
|-id=109
| 8109 Danielwilliam ||  || Daniel William Hergenrother (born 2010), a son of the discoverer. || 
|-id=110
| 8110 Heath ||  || Alan W. Heath (born 1931) is a British planetary observer. He was director of the British Astronomical Association's Saturn section during 1964–1970 and 1976–1994. He has also served the BAA as assistant director of the Jupiter section and secretary of the Lunar section. He was awarded the BAA's Goodacre Medal in 1986 || 
|-id=111
| 8111 Hoepli || 1995 GE || Ulrico Hoepli (1847–1935), Italian publisher, who donated a planetarium to the city of Milan Src || 
|-id=112
| 8112 Cesi || 1995 JJ || Federico Cesi (1585–1630), a scientist and humanist of the Italian Renaissance who founded the Accademia dei Lincei || 
|-id=113
| 8113 Matsue ||  || Matsue, a city located in the ancient Izumo district in western Japan. A beautiful city rich in culture, history and archeological remains, Matsue has been designated as an International Cultural Center || 
|-id=114
| 8114 Lafcadio ||  || Lafcadio Hearn (1850–1904), Irish-Greek writer who worked as a newspaper reporter in the United States for 20 years before moving to Japan in 1890, changing his name to Yakumo Koizumi and becoming a naturalized Japanese citizen. || 
|-id=115
| 8115 Sakabe ||  || Sanjiro Sakabe (1923–2001), an amateur astronomer who studied under the late Issei Yamamoto. Sakabe is the founder of the Dynic Astronomical Observatory, which contributes to the spread of astronomy in the surrounding area || 
|-id=116
| 8116 Jeanperrin ||  || Jean Baptiste Perrin (1870–1942), French physicist who studied the Brownian motion of minute particles suspended in liquids || 
|-id=117
| 8117 Yuanlongping ||  || Longping Yuan (1930–2021), member of the Chinese Academy of Engineering, head of the National Hybrid Rice Engineering and Technical Research Center of China. As the founder of the Chinese hybrid rice research effort, he contributes greatly to great production in China and worldwide. He has won many international prizes and is honored as the "Father of Hybrid Rice" by foreign colleagues || 
|-id=120
| 8120 Kobe || 1997 VT || Kobe the primary port on the Seto Inland Sea since the eighth century and one of Japan's most cosmopolitan cities, where the discoverer lived for five years during his student days. Kobe has made a remarkable recovery from the Great Hanshin earthquake in 1995. Name proposed by the discoverer and citation proposed by I. Hasegawa || 
|-id=121
| 8121 Altdorfer || 2572 P-L || Albrecht Altdorfer (c. 1480–1538), German painter of the Renaissance || 
|-id=122
| 8122 Holbein || 4038 P-L || Hans Holbein the Elder (c. 1465–1524) and Hans Holbein the Younger (c. 1497–1543), German painters || 
|-id=123
| 8123 Canaletto || 3138 T-1 || Canaletto (1697–1768), Venetian artist || 
|-id=124
| 8124 Guardi || 4370 T-1 || Francesco Guardi (1712–1793), Italian painter of the Rococo period || 
|-id=125
| 8125 Tyndareus || 5493 T-2 || Tyndareus, king of Sparta from Greek mythology || 
|-id=126
| 8126 Chanwainam || 1966 BL || Chan Wainam (born 1919), Chinese educator and charity worker || 
|-id=127
| 8127 Beuf || 1967 HA || Francisco Beuf (1834–1889), a French astronomer, who participated in the organization of the Argentinian Navy School and the La Plata Observatory, of which he was the first director || 
|-id=128
| 8128 Nicomachus || 1967 JP || Nicomachus ( c. 120 AD), Greek mathematician || 
|-id=129
| 8129 Michaelbusch ||  || Michael W. Busch (born 1987), a Jansky Fellow at the Department of Earth and Space Sciences of the University of California, Los Angeles. || 
|-id=130
| 8130 Seeberg ||  || Gotha Observatory (Seeberg Observatory), situated upon a well-marked hill close to the town of Gotha. In the time of the duke Ernst II von Sachsen-Gotha-Altenburg (1745–1804) and the astronomer F. X. von Zach, it was an important center for astronomy. The first meeting of European astronomers took place at the Seeberg Observatory in August 1798. This naming honors the 200th anniversary of that conference, as well as the 1998 International Spring Meeting of the Astronomische Gesellschaft in Gotha, held on the occasion of this anniversary. Name endorsed by P. Brosche || 
|-id=131
| 8131 Scanlon || 1976 SC || Leo J. Scanlon (1903–1999) amateur astronomer, co-founder of the Amateur Astronomers Association of Pittsburgh, or AAAP. Member of the Academy of Science and Art of Pittsburgh. || 
|-id=132
| 8132 Vitginzburg ||  || Vitaly Ginzburg (1916–2009), Russian physicist and Nobelist || 
|-id=133
| 8133 Takanochoei ||  || Takano Choei (1804–1850) was born in Mizusawa, Iwate prefecture. He was a physician and scholar of Dutch studies (Western learning) in the late Edo period || 
|-id=134
| 8134 Minin ||  || Kuz'ma Minich Zakhar'ev Sukhorukij (Kuz'ma Minin, died 1616) was one of the organizers of the second people's volunteer corps in Nizhnij Novgorod during 1611–1612. He displayed great action and personal bravery in the battle with Polish troops near Moscow and is a favorite national hero in Russia || 
|-id=135
| 8135 Davidmitchell ||  || David Francis Mitchell (born 1962) is the "Acting Director of Planetary Science Projects" and "Director of Flight Projects" (FPD) for NASA's Lucy mission. He has also been selected as the "Director of Engineering and Technology" at Goddard Space Flight Center (GSFC) in 2021. || 
|-id=136
| 8136 Landis ||  || Rob R. Landis (born 1963) is a NEO Program Officer at NASA Headquarters. Rob's lifelong passion for astronomy has taken him from working part-time while in college at Abrams Planetarium, through a widely varied career on NASA missions, including HST, Cassini, Mars Exploration Rovers and the ISS || 
|-id=137
| 8137 Kvíz || 1979 SJ || Zdeněk Kvíz (1932–1993), Czech astronomer || 
|-id=138
| 8138 Craigbowers ||  || Craig Bowers (born 1958) was a meridian-telescope observer for the Perth 75 catalogue, and also monitored variable stars. He was heavily involved in the continuous Lowell/Perth telescope CCD observations of 1P/Halley, including the discovery of the jets of CN gas leading to the defining of the rotation period of the nucleus. His PhD thesis detailed the scientific history of Perth Observatory from 1960 to 1993. || 
|-id=139
| 8139 Paulabell ||  || Paul A. Abell (born 1965), lead scientist for small bodies in the Astromaterials Research and Exploration Science Directorate at the NASA Johnson Space Center. || 
|-id=140
| 8140 Hardersen ||  || Paul S. Hardersen (born 1965), a professor and observatory director in the Department of Space Studies at the University of North Dakota. || 
|-id=141
| 8141 Nikolaev ||  || Nikolaev is a city and large industrial and cultural center in southern Ukraine. The Nikolaev Astronomical Observatory was established there in 1821 || 
|-id=142
| 8142 Zolotov ||  || Andrej Andreevich Zolotov (born 1937), Russian screenwriter and art and music critic. He is the author of more than 30 documentary films about Russian musicians, composers and conductors. Name suggested by G. Sviridov and supported by the discoverer || 
|-id=143
| 8143 Nezval || 1982 VN || Vítězslav Nezval (1900–1958), a Czech poet, founder of the Poetism movement and later founder of the surrealist group of Czechoslovakia || 
|-id=144
| 8144 Hiragagennai ||  || Hiraga Gennai (1728–1779) was born in Takamatsu, Kagawa prefecture. He was a scientist, pharmacologist and playwright in the middle Edo period || 
|-id=145
| 8145 Valujki ||  || The small Russian town of Valujki, founded in 1593 as a southern fortress of the Moscow State, is the center of the Valujki district of the Belgorod region. Located at a picturesque place near the confluence of the Valuj and Oskol rivers, it is a town of railwaymen and of workers in the food industry || 
|-id=146
| 8146 Jimbell || 1983 WG || James Francis Bell III (born 1965), American astronomer and planetary scientist at Cornell University || 
|-id=147
| 8147 Colemanhawkins ||  || Coleman Hawkins (1904–1969), American jazz tenor saxophonist || 
|-id=148
| 8148 Golding ||  || Margarette Oliver Golding (1881–1939) founded the Inner Wheel movement in 1924, one of the largest women's voluntary service organizations in the world. || 
|-id=149
| 8149 Ruff ||  || Jan Ruff (born 1949) is the very capable, warm-spirited and enthusiastic chief of the Office of Public Affairs for Goddard Space Center, NASA. Steve Ruff (born 1949) is an imaginative, creative and knowledgeable middle-school teacher with a wonderful dry sense of humor || 
|-id=150
| 8150 Kaluga ||  || Kaluga, a town in the Russian Federation and the focus of the Kalugian region, is a prominent industrial and cultural center. Founded in 1371, the town is much recorded in the history of Russia. The Tsiolkovsky Museum of Cosmonautics and one of the oldest theaters in Russia are located there || 
|-id=151
| 8151 Andranada ||  || Andrej Vladimirovich Shakhov (born 1954) works in the faculty of diseases of the ear, nose and throat at the Nizhnij Novgorod State Medical Academy. His wife, Natalia Mikhailovna Shakhova (born 1957) works in the faculty of midwifery and gynecology || 
|-id=152
| 8152 Martinlee || 1986 VY || Martin Lee (born 1964) is a researcher based at the University of Glasgow. He is an expert on thermal and aqueous alteration of minerals in martian and chondritic meteorites and the effects of shock metamorphism on meteorite parent bodies. || 
|-id=153
| 8153 Gattacceca ||  || Jérôme Gattacceca (born 1973) is a research scientist based in CEREGE à Aix-en-Provence, France. Jérôme is an expert on the magnetic signatures of meteorites and Moon rocks. He leads meteorite recovery missions to the Atacama desert in Chile, and is the head of the Meteoritical Society nomenclature committee. || 
|-id=154
| 8154 Stahl ||  || Georg Ernst Stahl (16601734), German physician and chemist who developed the phlogiston theory of combustion, which dominated chemical thought for almost a century. Contrary to the view of his friend Friedrich Hoffmann at the University of Halle, who considered living organisms as machines to be explained by the laws of mechanics, Stahl insisted that neither mechanical nor chemical laws alone were sufficient to account for the phenomenon of life. Most likely influenced by his pietism, he insisted that life required a force for which he reserved the Latin word anima, which in turn gave rise to the theory of animism (vitalism) || 
|-id=155
| 8155 Battaglini || 1988 QA || Giuseppe Battaglini (1826–1894), Italian mathematician || 
|-id=156
| 8156 Tsukada || 1988 TR || Shinsuke Tsukada (born 1954), director of the Yonago City Planetarium, Tottori Prefecture, and an executive member of the San-in Society of Astronomy, the Tottori Society of Astronomy. Provider of varied and informative planetarium programs for the general public on an ongoing basis, he spends his free evenings searching for comets. Name proposed by the discoverers following a suggestion by Y. Yamada || 
|-id=158
| 8158 Herder ||  || Johann Gottfried Herder (1744–1803), German poet, theologian and philosopher || 
|-id=159
| 8159 Fukuoka ||  || Takashi Fukuoka (born 1948), director of the planetarium at Sanbe Shizenkan Open Field Museum, Shimane Prefecture, and president of the San-in Society of Astronomy. A hardworking and painstaking planner of astronomy events and workshops, he is particularly concerned with meeting the needs of those new to astronomy in his local area. His main research is luminosity functions of globular clusters. Name proposed by the discoverers following a suggestion by Y. Yamada || 
|-id=161
| 8161 Newman ||  || Constance B. Newman (born 1935), Smithsonian Institution undersecretary whose unwavering devotion to the principles of exemplary management and diversity has enabled the Smithsonian to flourish and the Astrophysical Observatory to thrive || 
|-id=163
| 8163 Ishizaki ||  || Masako Ishizaki (1902–?), Japanese amateur astronomer || 
|-id=164
| 8164 Andreasdoppler ||  || Andreas Doppler (born 1963), German amateur astronomer || 
|-id=165
| 8165 Gnädig ||  || Arno Gnädig (born 1956), German amateur astronomer at the Archenhold Observatory , Src/Src || 
|-id=166
| 8166 Buczynski ||  || Denis Buczynski (born 1951), British amateur astronomer || 
|-id=167
| 8167 Ishii ||  || Takahiro Ishii (born 1959), Japanese amateur astronomer and active owner of the Kamogawa Observatory, Chiba Prefecture. He is a strong supporter of neighborhood amateurs, and his contribution to popularizing and disseminating celestial photography techniques makes him welcome in gatherings nationwide. Name proposed by the discoverers following a suggestion by Y. Yamada || 
|-id=168
| 8168 Rogerbourke ||  || Roger D. Bourke (born 1938), engineer at JPL who worked on several planetary exploration missions || 
|-id=169
| 8169 Mirabeau ||  || Count of Mirabeau (1749–1791), French writer, orator and statesman || 
|-id=171
| 8171 Stauffenberg ||  || Claus von Stauffenberg (1907–1944), German aristocrat and Wehrmacht officer, one of the leading figures in the plot to assassinate Adolf Hitler || 
|-id=175
| 8175 Boerhaave ||  || Herman Boerhaave (1668–1738), Dutch physician and anatomist || 
|-id=181
| 8181 Rossini ||  || Gioachino Rossini (1792–1868), Italian composer || 
|-id=182
| 8182 Akita || 1992 TX || Isao Akita (born 1948), president of the comet observers network in Japan, "Hoshi no Hiroba", since 1988. He is a well-known amateur astronomer and keen observer and photographer of comets and galaxies. He is especially at home assisting in the efforts of other comet enthusiasts, both within his group and throughout the country. Name proposed by the discoverers following a suggestion by Y. Yamada || 
|-id=184
| 8184 Luderic || 1992 WL || Luderic Maury (born 1984) has been an amateur astronomer, eclipse chaser and the joy and pride of his parents ever since his birth in Nice. The number of the minor planet is the sum of 3780 and 4404, the numbers of the minor planets honoring his parents, Carine and Alain Maury. || 
|-id=187
| 8187 Akiramisawa || 1992 XL || Botanist Akira Misawa (1942–1994), a professor at Chiba University, conducted research on the effects of light pollution on plants || 
|-id=188
| 8188 Okegaya ||  || Okegaya Marsh, Shizuoka prefecture, Japan || 
|-id=189
| 8189 Naruke ||  || Giiti Naruke (born 1949) is the first Japanese to achieve two consecutive wins at the world championship for radio-controlled airplanes, and he is making every endeavor to bring up a future champion || 
|-id=190
| 8190 Bouguer ||  || Pierre Bouguer (1698–1758), French mathematician. founder of astronomical photometry || 
|-id=191
| 8191 Mersenne ||  || Marin Mersenne (1588–1648), French mathematician, theologian and philosopher || 
|-id=192
| 8192 Tonucci || 1993 RB || Giuseppe Tonucci (1938–1988), Italian cyclist and champion || 
|-id=193
| 8193 Ciaurro || 1993 SF || Ilario Ciaurro (1889–1992), an art teacher and ceramist, but most famous as a painter. His favorite subject was Terni, his adopted town, and he loved using etchings, poems and stories to explore its innermost aspects || 
|-id=194
| 8194 Satake ||  || Masaaki Satake (born 1956), a Japanese amateur astronomer and secretary of the Kansai Astronomical Society since 1972. Active in organizing local star parties for amateur astronomers and lay persons alike, he is a part-time journalist rigorous in describing and recording astronomy-related events in his native city of Kyoto. Name proposed by the discoverers following a suggestion by Y. Yamada || 
|-id=197
| 8197 Mizunohiroshi || 1993 VX || Hiroshi Mizuno (born 1951), Okayama Seishin University, is a theoretician on the origin of our solar system. He developed a theory about the formation of thick atmospheres of giant planets, such as Jupiter, with intensive studies on the sudden accretion of gas onto the solid core. This mechanism is called the Mizuno process || 
|-id=199
| 8199 Takagitakeo || 1993 XR || Takeo Takagi (1909–1982) played an active part in astronomical education as one of the first planetarians in Japan. In 1939 he joined the staff of the Osaka Electric-Science Museum, famous for its 1937 installation of the first planetarium in Japan. After retiring from the museum, he opened a private planetarium || 
|-id=200
| 8200 Souten ||  || Waseda University Astronomy Association, nicknamed "Souten". Established in 1959 by Hidetaka Tojo, Souten has produced an astronaut and many astrophotographers and observers. The discoverers of this minor planet were members of Souten || 
|}

8201–8300 

|-id=202
| 8202 Gooley ||  || Barry Gooley (born 1956), president of the astronomy shop Kokusai Kohki in Kyoto. || 
|-id=203
| 8203 Jogolehmann ||  || Johann Gottlob Lehmann (1719–1767), a German geologist. || 
|-id=204
| 8204 Takabatake ||  || Tohru Takabatake (born 1957), a junior-high-school teacher and secretary of the Okayama Astronomical Society. || 
|-id=205
| 8205 Van Dijck ||  || Anthony van Dyck (1599–1641), Flemish painter || 
|-id=206
| 8206 Masayuki ||  || Masayuki Okumura (born 1960), a hydrographer for the Japanese Coast Guard.  || 
|-id=207
| 8207 Suminao ||  || Suminao Murakami (born 1935), the son and grandson of astronomers, is a representative of the Laboratory of Urban Safety Planning in Tokyo and a former professor at the Yokohama National and other Universities. || 
|-id=208
| 8208 Volta ||  || Alessandro Volta (1745–1827), Italian physicist and pioneer of electricity and power. || 
|-id=209
| 8209 Toscanelli ||  || Paolo dal Pozzo Toscanelli (1397–1482) was an Italian physician, astronomer, cosmographer and mathematician. Columbus may have used his map of the world on the 1492 voyage. Toscanelli was the first to plot observations of comets on star charts, thereby supplying considerably improved information about their sky positions || 
|-id=210
| 8210 NANTEN || 1995 EH || NANTEN, a 4-meter telescope for millimeter and submillimeter wavelengths, is operated by Nagoya University. || 
|-id=212
| 8212 Naoshigetani ||  || Naoshige Tani (1925–), a member of the Photovoltaic Popularization Association in Japan and producer of the organization's web site. || 
|-id=214
| 8214 Mirellalilli || 1995 FH || Mirella Lilli (born 1959), wife of Italian discoverer Stefano Mottola, on the occasion of their twentieth wedding anniversary (2007 August) || 
|-id=215
| 8215 Zanonato || 1995 FZ || Flavio Zanonato (born 1950) is a prominent businessman and civic-minded amateur astronomer in his native city of Padova. For the past 15 years he has spearheaded initiatives to restore Padova's great astronomical heritage, e.g., the great clock || 
|-id=216
| 8216 Melosh ||  || Jay Melosh (born 1947), of the Lunar and Planetary Laboratory, has worked on the formation of impact craters on the terrestrial planets and the "giant impact" origin of the moon. His "Panspermia" idea involves the ejection by impact of spall products containing microorganisms and their transfer to other planets. || 
|-id=217
| 8217 Dominikhašek || 1995 HC || Dominik Hašek (born 1965), goalkeeper of the Czech Olympic hockey team. || 
|-id=218
| 8218 Hosty || 1996 JH || John Graham Hosty (1949–2001), was the visual discoverer of the nova HS Sge from Huddersfield, West Yorkshire, in 1977. This find, made with a simple 10×50 monocular, encouraged others to join the U.K. Nova Patrol to look for such objects. The name was suggested by G. M. Hurst and B. G. Marsden. || 
|-id=220
| 8220 Nanyou ||  || Nanyou, the city where the discoverer lives and his observatory is located. || 
|-id=221
| 8221 La Condamine ||  || Charles-Marie de La Condamine (1701–1774), a French naturalist and mathematician. || 
|-id=222
| 8222 Gellner || 1996 OX || František Gellner (1881–1914), a Czech poet and Bohemian anarchist. His poetry depicted, sometimes in shocking ways, night life in a big city. He died in the front lines during World War I. || 
|-id=223
| 8223 Bradshaw || 1996 PD || The Bradshaw mountains, located south of Prescott, Arizona, in the United States. This area of sparsely populated pine-covered mountains provides a dark southern sky for the Prescott Observatory. The mountains themselves were named for William D. Bradshaw, a Western adventurer and miner. || 
|-id=224
| 8224 Fultonwright || 1996 PE || Fulton Wright Jr. (born 1937), a friend of the discoverer, professor at Yavapai College. || 
|-id=225
| 8225 Emerson || 1996 QC || David Emerson (died 1996), lecturer in astrophysics at the Royal Observatory, Edinburgh. His research interests were in the interaction of matter and radiation and star formation. He was director of studies of the first discoverer. Emerson was also an ordained lay-preacher in the Scottish Episcopal Church. He died at a relatively young age on 26 September 1996, just a few weeks after the discovery was made. || 
|-id=229
| 8229 Kozelský ||  || Frantisek Kozelský (born 1913), a Czech telescope maker. || 
|-id=230
| 8230 Perona ||  || Renato Perona (1927–1984), a track cycling champion. || 
|-id=231
| 8231 Tetsujiyamada ||  || Tetsuji Yamada (born 1952), an amateur astronomer. || 
|-id=232
| 8232 Akiramizuno ||  || Akira Mizuno (born 1960), professor at Nagoya University. || 
|-id=233
| 8233 Asada ||  || Tadashi Asada (born 1954), professor of computer science at Kyushu International University. || 
|-id=234
| 8234 Nobeoka ||  || Nobeoka, a Japanese town in Miyazaki prefecture, at the mouth of the Gokase River. Although it is the site of one of the largest chemical factories in Japan, it remains rich in natural beauty. The sound of the bell at the top of the castle hill is described in a poem by Bokusui Wakayama. Name proposed by the discoverer following a suggestion by T. Sato and R. Ukishima. || 
|-id=235
| 8235 Fragonard || 2096 P-L || Jean-Honoré Fragonard (1732–1806), a French painter and a student of Boucher. Both teacher and pupil painted the colorful world of the Rococo aristocracy. In his landscape paintings Fragonard shows the influence of the Venetian artists. || 
|-id=236
| 8236 Gainsborough || 4040 P-L || Thomas Gainsborough (1727–1788), a British portrait and landscape painter. He was strongly influenced by the Rococo style and Dutch landscape painting, and his work is characterized by luminous colors. His portraits often feature fine landscapes, and he is notable for painting not only the aristocracy of England but also its farmers. || 
|-id=237
| 8237 Constable || 7581 P-L || John Constable (1776–1837), a British landscape painter. A forerunner of the Impressionists of the late nineteenth century, he is notable for his use of color. For some time he made portraits, but later he went back to landscape painting. || 
|-id=238
| 8238 Courbet || 4232 T-1 || Gustave Courbet (1819–1877), an autodidact who studied nature and the great paintings in the Louvre. || 
|-id=239
| 8239 Signac || 1153 T-2 || Paul Signac (1863–1935) worked together with Seurat to develop the technique of pointillism. For his pointillistic paintings Signac mostly chose water, ships and ports as subjects. After Seurat and Signac not many painters worked in this time-consuming method. || 
|-id=240
| 8240 Matisse || 4172 T-2 || Henri Matisse (1869–1954), a French artist who studied at the School of Fine Arts in Paris. After traveling through Europe and the Pacific islands, he initially developed an Impressionistic style of painting. Later he became the leader of a new school, Fauvism, characterized by bold use of color and distorted forms. || 
|-id=241
| 8241 Agrius ||  || Agrius, a Greek from Aetolia and father of Thersites. Thersites was the ugliest Greek in Troy. || 
|-id=242
| 8242 Joshemery ||  || Joshua P. Emery (born 1973), a minor-planet spectroscopist in the Department of Earth and Planetary Sciences of the University of Tennessee. || 
|-id=243
| 8243 Devonburr ||  || Devon M. Burr (born 1966), a geomorphologist in the Department of Earth and Planetary Sciences of the University of Tennessee. || 
|-id=244
| 8244 Mikolaichuk ||  || Ivan Vasilievich Mikolaichuk (1941–1987), a talented Ukrainian cinema artist, scenario writer and film director. || 
|-id=245
| 8245 Molnar ||  || Lawrence A. Molnar (born 1959), a professor of physics and astronomy and Observatory Director at Calvin College, Grand Rapids, MI. || 
|-id=246
| 8246 Kotov ||  || Valerij Aleksandrovich Kotov (born 1943), a Solar physicist, has worked at the Crimean Astrophysical Observatory for more than 30 years. In the early 1970s he pioneered the field of helioseismology, the study of the interior structure and energy sources of the sun and other stars. || 
|-id=247
| 8247 Cherylhall ||  || Cheryl L. Hall (born 1945) served the planetary science community from 1987 to 2012 at Cornell University. || 
|-id=248
| 8248 Gurzuf ||  || Gurzuf, small town near Yalta at the south coast of the Crimea. || 
|-id=249
| 8249 Gershwin || 1980 GG || George Gershwin (1898–1937), an American composer who was also an accomplished pianist. In his compositions the techniques and forms of art music are blended in varying degrees with the stylistic nuances and techniques of popular music and jazz. The name was suggested by J. Ticha and M. Tichy. || 
|-id=250
| 8250 Cornell || 1980 RP || Cornell University, in Ithaca, New York, on the occasion of its hosting the "Asteroids, Comets, Meteors" conference in July 1999. Cornell was founded by Ezra Cornell in 1865. An acknowledged center for discovery, academic leadership and service, it is, in a very real sense, a world treasure. The university operates the Arecibo Observatory, the premier site for radar astronomy in the world, and it continues to play a leading role in the exploration of minor planets and comets by spacecraft. Name proposed and citation written by J. Veverka. || 
|-id=251
| 8251 Isogai || 1980 VA || Rensuke Isogai (born 1941), a high-school classmate of the discoverer. || 
|-id=252
| 8252 Elkins-Tanton ||  || Linda T. Elkins-Tanton (born 1965), the Director of the Department of Terrestrial Magnetism, Carnegie Institution of Washington || 
|-id=253
| 8253 Brunetto ||  || Rosario Brunetto (born 1980), an astronomer at the Institut d'Astrophysique Spatiale in Orsay, France, who specializes in laboratory ionization investigations of space weathering processes on minor-planet surfaces. || 
|-id=254
| 8254 Moskovitz ||  || Nicholas A. Moskovitz (born 1981), a postdoctoral research scientist at the Carnegie Institution for Science in Washington, DC. || 
|-id=255
| 8255 Masiero ||  || Joseph Masiero (born 1982), an American astronomer and former postdoctoral fellow at the JPL in California. He is a discoverer of minor planets. His 2009 Ph.D. thesis at the University of Hawaii investigated asteroid polarization. Currently he is processing and analyzing minor-planet measurements by the Wide-field Infrared Survey Explorer satellite. || 
|-id=256
| 8256 Shenzhou ||  || Shenzhou spacecraft. "Shenzhou", meaning "Miracle Ship", is used for the first series of Chinese crewed spaceships || 
|-id=257
| 8257 Andycheng ||  || Andrew F. Cheng (born 1951), planetary scientist at the Applied Physics Laboratory of Johns Hopkins University. Cheng served as the project scientist on the NEAR mission to (433) Eros and has made significant contributions to a wide variety of solar-system topics, including the study of magnetospheres and investigations of minor-planet surfaces and geodesy using LIDAR techniques. Name proposed by the discoverer and B. E. Clark, and citation written by J. Veverka. || 
|-id=258
| 8258 McCracken ||  || Ken McCracken (born 1933) has done pioneering work in cosmic and X ray astronomy, contributing to the understanding of solar proton events and their propagation in the heliosphere. He designed instruments for four Pioneer and two Explorer mission, and had a leading role in the development of mineral exploration technology. || 
|-id=260
| 8260 Momcheva || 1984 SH || Ivelina Momcheva (born 1980), a Bulgarian astronomer, is known for her research on gravitational lensing and galaxy clusters. While she has already glimpsed the 3D structure of the distant universe through her research, she still hopes to achieve her life goal of glimpsing an antlered moose in the wild || 
|-id=261
| 8261 Ceciliejulie || 1985 RD || Cecilie Ida and Julie Liv Cetti Hansen (born 1992), twin daughters of Danish astrophysicist Anja C. Andersen; see (8820). || 
|-id=262
| 8262 Carcich || 1985 RG || Brian T. Carcich (born 1956), developer of innovative computer software at Cornell University. Carcich has been responsible for developing key software used to acquire remote sensing data on spacecraft missions to minor planets and comets, including NEAR, Galileo and CONTOUR. Name suggested and citation provided by J. Veverka. || 
|-id=266
| 8266 Bertelli || 1986 TC || Francesco Bertelli (1794–1844), an Italian astronomer at the observatory of Bologna and successor to P. Caturegli (1786–1833) as professor of astronomy at the University of Bologna. Only the first volume of his book, Elementi di Meccanica Celeste, was published at Bologna (1841) before his untimely death. He collaborated in the calculation of the Effemeridi, the annual publication initiated in 1715 by E. Manfredi (1674–1739) and that ceased with Bertelli's death in 1844. || 
|-id=267
| 8267 Kiss ||  || John Z. Kiss (born 1960) co-led at NASA an international life science and plant biology project on the ISS. This led to discoveries on multiple light sensory systems in plants, which set the stage for upcoming missions addressing the use of plants in bio-regenerative life support systems for future crewed missions. || 
|-id=268
| 8268 Goerdeler ||  || Carl Friedrich Goerdeler (1884–1945), mayor of the towns of Königsberg and Leipzig, respectively (1920–1937). Early on he opposed the fascist dictatorship. After the outbreak of World War II, he became the leading force behind a Resistance group of conservative-minded Germans, planning a coup d´état against the fascist leader through contacts with a military opposition. Goerdeler's main goal was to restore and institutionalize a state of law. In September 1944, he was condemned to death by the Volksgerichtshof. || 
|-id=269
| 8269 Calandrelli || 1988 QB || Ignazio Calandrelli (1792–1866), Italian astronomer and professor of optics and astronomy in Bologna and Rome || 
|-id=270
| 8270 Winslow || 1989 JF || John Seymour Winslow, a friend of the discoverer's husband, Ron, since grade school. || 
|-id=271
| 8271 Imai || 1989 NY || Yasushi Imai (born 1949) was the president of a planetarium manufacturing company from 1998 to 2009 || 
|-id=272
| 8272 Iitatemura || 1989 SG || Iitatemura, village located in Fukushima Prefecture, Japan. || 
|-id=273
| 8273 Apatheia ||  || Apatheia is a philosophical word that means "an immovable soul" in Greek philosophy. || 
|-id=274
| 8274 Soejima ||  || Tsutomu Soejima (born 1950), a Japanese amateur astronomer. || 
|-id=275
| 8275 Inca ||  || The Inca people of South America. || 
|-id=276
| 8276 Shigei || 1991 FL || Mika Shigei (born 1968), lecturer and curator of the Gotoh Planetarium and Astronomical Museum in Tokyo. || 
|-id=277
| 8277 Machu-Picchu ||  || Machu Picchu, "old peak", 2350 meters high, is the site of ancient Inca ruins about 80 km northwest of Cuzco. When he discovered the nearly intact pre-Columbian ruins, Hiram Bingham thought he had found the "lost city of the Incas", but the building style suggests it was the palace of Pachacuti Inca Yupanqui (c. 1438–1471) || 
|-id=279
| 8279 Cuzco ||  || Cusco (Cuzco), the capital of the Inca empire || 
|-id=280
| 8280 Petergruber ||  || Budapest-born Peter Gruber (born 1929) arrived in the U.S. in 1951 and built up a successful asset-management business. This enabled him to establish the Gruber Foundation with its principal focus of recognizing notable human achievement, including since 2000 an annual Cosmology Prize in conjunction with the IAU || 
|-id=282
| 8282 Delp ||  || Alfred Delp (1907–1945), a German theologian. Beginning in 1942, he was a member of the illegal "Kreisauer Kreis", a group of political conservatives who worked to eliminate the Nazi regime. With this group, Delp collaborated on a first draft of a Christian social order for his country. Following the 1944 attempt on the fascist leader's life, he was condemned to death and executed in February 1945. || 
|-id=283
| 8283 Edinburgh || 1991 SV || Edinburgh, the historic city of Scotland. Long a center of learning, it became the focus of the Scottish Enlightenment in the 18th century. It is the home of the world's largest arts festival, comprising the Edinburgh International Festival and the Fringe. Edinburgh became the first UNESCO City of Literature in 2004. || 
|-id=284
| 8284 Cranach ||  || Lucas Cranach the Elder (1472–1553), a German painter, draftsman and copper engraver. || 
|-id=286
| 8286 Kouji ||  || Kouji Yamamoto (born 1956), a Japanese architect and amateur astronomer. || 
|-id=289
| 8289 An-Eefje ||  || An and Eefje, two young Belgian women, whose young and hopeful lives came dramatically to an end in 1996. May their memory stand for all women throughout the world who suffer from abuse. || 
|-id=291
| 8291 Bingham ||  || Hiram Bingham III (1785–1956), a member of the history faculty at Yale University, went searching for the lost city of the Incas. After tremendous effort he found it---Machu Picchu---high in the Andes, not far from Cuzco, on 1911 July 24. || 
|-id=294
| 8294 Takayuki ||  || Takayuki Kawabata (born 1959), president of astronomy shop Planet Town, Kumamoto, Kyushu Island. || 
|-id=295
| 8295 Toshifukushima ||  || Toshio Fukushima (born 1954), a Japanese astronomer working mainly on general relativity, positional astronomy and celestial mechanics. He is current president of the IAU Commission 31 and served as chair of the local organizing committee for the IAU General Assembly in Kyoto in 1997. He created the current version of Japanese Ephemeris, published by the Japanese Hydrographic Department, and contributed to the introduction of general relativity into the current IAU system of time systems, reference frames and astronomical constants. He has been the director of the public relations center of the National Astronomical Observatory of Japan since 1998. || 
|-id=296
| 8296 Miyama || 1993 AD || Shoken M. Miyama (born 1951), Japanese astrophysicist working mainly on star and planet formation. He was the principal investigator on the observation team that first detected the protoplanetary disk around a single star using the Nobeyama radio telescope. He was the first director of the public relations center of the National Astronomical Observatory of Japan and since 1996 has been the executive vice-director. || 
|-id=297
| 8297 Gérardfaure ||  || Gérard Fauré, a French amateur astronomer and member of the "Millennium Club". He performs visual estimates of minor planets with magnitude discrepancies, pushing the limiting magnitude with his C8 telescope as far as visual magnitude 16.0 (Magnitude Alert Program). In 1996 he saw his 1000th minor planet visually. || 
|-id=298
| 8298 Loubna ||  || Loubna, a Moroccan-Belgian girl, whose young life came abruptly to an end. May she stand as a symbol for a hopeful life in a multicultural society. || 
|-id=299
| 8299 Téaleoni ||  || Téa Leoni (born 1966), American actress, much admired in the futuristic movie Deep Impact (1998). She studied anthropology and psychology. || 
|-id=300
| 8300 Iga ||  || Yuichi Iga (born 1955) is a specialist in molecular graphics and medical imaging. As an amateur astronomer, he has been energetically observing Jupiter since 1971. Currently he is secretary of the Jupiter-Saturn Section of the Oriental Astronomical Association. || 
|}

8301–8400 

|-
| 8301 Haseyuji ||  || Yuji Hase (1964–2002), an instructor of material technology at Kumamoto technical high school, played a leading role in amateur astronomical computing and was an active founding member of Kumamoto Civil Astronomical Observatory || 
|-id=302
| 8302 Kazukin || 1995 CY || Kazuo Kinoshita (born 1957) is an amateur astronomer and computer programmer. He has contributed to astronomy with his comet and minor planet orbit calculation programs and observation device control programs || 
|-id=303
| 8303 Miyaji ||  || Miyaji Takeshi (born 1948) is an astronomer specializing in radio astronomy and VLBI. He is among the members of the National Astronomical Observatory of Japan promoting the VLBI Exploration of Radio Astrometry and VLBI Space Observatory Program plans of the Institute of Space and Astronautical Science || 
|-id=304
| 8304 Ryomichico ||  || Ryo Michico (born 1955) is a novelist and poet respected for her beautiful science fantasies. Her best-known works are Asteroid Museum (1990) and Radio-star Restaurant (1991) || 
|-id=305
| 8305 Teika ||  || Fujiwara-no-Teika (1162–1241) was a Japanese literary figure who wrote many famous short poems. In his book Meigetsuki ("Bright Moon Diary") he discussed the 1054 supernova, which had been recorded by early astronomers in the Orient || 
|-id=306
| 8306 Shoko ||  || Shoko Sawada (born 1962), Japanese singer and songwriter. Since her debut in 1979, she has released 52 singles and 22 albums, ranging from touching ballads to rhythmical pop songs. Her recordings have fascinated many fans in Japan, including the discoverer of this minor planet || 
|-id=307
| 8307 Peltan || 1995 EN || The Peltans, the family of discoverer Jana Tichá (née Peltanová), including her mother Marie (née Kosová) Peltanová (born 1930), her father Bohuslav Peltan (1927–1983), her brother Jiří Peltan (born 1953), her sister-in-law Adéla (born 1951) and her nephews Petr (born 1983) and Libor (born 1989). || 
|-id=308
| 8308 Julie-Mélissa ||  || Julie Lejeune and Mélissa Russo (both age 8), two Belgian children who were murdered tragically in 1996, symbolizing all innocent children suffering from abuse. || 
|-id=310
| 8310 Seelos ||  || Frank P. Seelos IV who, as a student at Wolford College, participated in the 1998 Caltech Summer Undergraduate Research Fellow program. He assisted and carried out research with the Near-Earth Asteroid Tracking program at the Jet Propulsion Laboratory and developed the software package HAVANA, which rapidly accesses images of specified objects from the extensive observational archive available. Frank is an outstanding student with a double major in physics and mathematics || 
|-id=311
| 8311 Zhangdaning ||  || Daning Zhang (born 1944), physician and vice-president of Tianjin Traditional Chinese Medicine (TCM) Hospital, professor of Tianjin Medical University, guest professor of Taiwan Chinese Academic College, chairman of the International TCM Kidney Diseases Conference. As the founder of the kidney diseases practice of TCM, he has won many international awards. He has written more than 60 publications on kidney disease || 
|-id=313
| 8313 Christiansen ||  || Wilbur N. Christiansen (born 1913), foreign member of the Chinese Academy of Sciences and unfailing friend of Chinese astronomers. A pioneer in radio astronomy, he invented and developed a series of radio telescopes that in their time provided the highest angular resolution. These were the "grating telescope", the "grating cross" and the "rotational synthesis telescope". His textbook on radio telescopes, with Högbom, was translated into Russian and Chinese. Immediately after the discovery of the 21-cm hydrogen line in space, he confirmed this and went on to make the first map that showed we live in a spiral galaxy. He served as a vice president of the IAU and as president of URSI, and he is now an honorary president of URSI || 
|-id=314
| 8314 Tsuji ||  || Takashi Tsuji (born 1937), Japanese astronomer working mainly on stellar atmospheres and spectroscopy. His major interest extends from cool luminous stars such as red giants, supergiants and carbon stars to very low luminous objects, including brown dwarfs. He received the academy prize of the Japan Academy in 1984 for "Theoretical studies of the outer layers of cool stars". He served as the director of the Institute of Astronomy, Faculty of Science, University of Tokyo, during 1992–1996. He has been professor emeritus of the University of Tokyo since 1998 || 
|-id=315
| 8315 Bajin ||  || Ba Jin (1904–2005), Chinese writer. || 
|-id=316
| 8316 Wolkenstein || 3002 P-L || Oswald von Wolkenstein (?1377–1445), one of the last minstrels. We know much about his life and times from his own songs, which have been preserved. At the age of ten he became shield-bearer for a knight and traveled throughout the world as a groom, cook and singer, eventually returning to his home castle of Wolkenstein in the Grödner valley in Tirol. He was also ambassador to the emperor Sigismund and traveled to England and the Iberian peninsula in his name. Especially interesting are his financial documents, which have all been saved and show the difficult position of knights around 1400 || 
|-id=317
| 8317 Eurysaces || 4523 P-L || Eurysaces, from Greek mythology, the son of Ajax by Tecmessa, known for his enormous shield. || 
|-id=318
| 8318 Averroes || 1306 T-2 || Averroes (1126–1198) was a medieval Islamic philosopher, whose Arabian name was Ibn Roschd Abdul Walid and who studied law and medicine in Córdoba. He brought together the philosophy of Aristotle, Islam and Christianity. Both Islam and the Christian church, especially Thomas Aquinas, condemned him. Most of his publications have been translated into Latin. || 
|-id=319
| 8319 Antiphanes || 3365 T-2 || Antiphanes (408–330 B.C.) was a Greek comic poet. Today 119 complete titles and about 300 fragments are known. He wrote parodies of Sophocles, Euripides and many different characters and professions. || 
|-id=320
| 8320 van Zee || 1955 RV || Liese van Zee (born 1970), on the faculty of Indiana University, has investigated the links between star formation, elemental enrichment and the gas distribution and kinematics in star-forming galaxies. Her work focuses on star-formation history and evolution of dwarf galaxies, including stellar-population models || 
|-id=321
| 8321 Akim || 1977 EX || Efraim Lazarevich Akim (born 1929), deputy director at the Keldysh Institute of Applied Mathematics, is an outstanding scientist in applied celestial mechanics to the moon and planets and the determination of parameters of the solar system || 
|-id=322
| 8322 Kononovich ||  || Aleksandr Konstantinovich Kononovich (1850–1910) was a professor at Novorossisk University and head of the Odessa Astronomical Observatory for many years. A pioneer in astrophysics, he is known for his photometric observations of the planets, photographic observations of the Sun and research on solar prominences. || 
|-id=323
| 8323 Krimigis || 1979 UH || Stamatios Krimigis (born 1938), a Greek-born American physicist, head of the Space Department of the Applied Physics Laboratory of Johns Hopkins University and a specialist in solar, interplanetary and magnetospheric physics. Krimigis has been principal investigator or coinvestigator on several space experiments, including the Low Energy Charged Particle experiments on Voyagers 1 and 2 and the Active Magnetospheric Particle Tracer Explorers. He spearheaded the establishment of NASA's Discovery program, and his department is managing NEAR, the first Discovery mission. || 
|-id=324
| 8324 Juliadeleón ||  || Julia de León Cruz (born 1977), an astronomer at the Instituto de Astrofisica de Andalucia in Granada, Spain. || 
|-id=325
| 8325 Trigo-Rodriguez ||  || Josep Maria Trigo-Rodriguez (born 1970) is a Consejo Superior de Investigaciones Científicas research scientist at the Institute of Space Studies of Catalonia. || 
|-id=326
| 8326 Paulkling ||  || Paul Kling, mayor of the city of Nördlingen, Germany, where the Nördlinger Ries Crater is located. He has successfully guided the prosperity and well-being of this ancient, walled Bavarian city as it has grown and developed and enters the twenty-first century. || 
|-id=327
| 8327 Weihenmayer ||  || Erik Weihenmayer (born 1968), sightless since age 13, holds the unique distinction of being the first blind mountain climber to conquer Mount Everest. His sense of adventure, courage, fortitude and perseverance have also led him to the summits of Denali, Kilimanjaro and Aconcagua. || 
|-id=328
| 8328 Uyttenhove ||  || Jozef Uyttenhove (born 1944), a Belgian (Flemish) physicist and historian of the exact sciences, who, during the nineteenth and twentieth centuries, has recently retired as a professor of physics and as director of the Museum for the History of Sciences at the University of Ghent. || 
|-id=329
| 8329 Speckman ||  || Mark Speckman (born 1955), American handicapped football coach at Willamette University, was born without hands. He has turned his physical handicap into positive affirmation, touching many with his uplifting story about never giving up, helping others and always doing the very best you can regardless of the circumstances. || 
|-id=330
|-id=331
| 8331 Dawkins ||  || Richard Dawkins (born 1941), British evolutionary biologist and chaired professor at Oxford University, is the author of the seminal work The Selfish Gene (1976) and other best-selling books on science and evolution. His novel concept of the ethology of genes revolutionized the study of evolution and animal behavior. He is the husband of actress Lalla Ward. || 
|-id=332
| 8332 Ivantsvetaev ||  || Ivan Vladimirovich Tsvetaev (1847–1913), a Russian art critic, professor of philology at the universities in Warsaw, Kiev, Moscow and St. Petersburg. || 
|-id=333
| 8333 Medina || 1982 VF || Francisco Medina (born 1952) co-led at ESA an international life science and plant biology project on the ISS. This led to discoveries on multiple light sensory systems in plants, which set the stage for upcoming missions addressing the use of plants in bio-regenerative life support systems for future crewed missions. || 
|-id=335
| 8335 Sarton ||  || George Sarton (1884–1956), Belgian-born American mathematician and author, founder of the magazines Isis and Osiris who moved to the U.S. in 1915. Author of influential books and a professor at Harvard University, he is credited with introducing the history of science as an important field of study in the U.S. || 
|-id=336
| 8336 Šafařík ||  || Vojtěch Šafařík (1829–1902), Czech astronomer known for his work in inorganic chemistry, Czech chemical nomenclature and textbooks, as well as for his observations of variable stars. He obtained about 20,000 observations of variable stars. This minor planet also honors the memory of his wife and co-worker Paulína Šafaříková (1836–1920), who was interested in the history and popularization of astronomy. Name suggested by J. Ticha and M. Tichy. || 
|-id=338
| 8338 Ralhan ||  || Philip Ralhan Bidstrup (born 1979), a Danish physicist. H obtained a doctorate from the University of Copenhagen in 2008 based on a feasibility study for detecting and observing small minor planets by a spacecraft in deep space. The name was suggested by A. C. Andersen. || 
|-id=339
| 8339 Kosovichia ||  || Aleksandr Grigorievich Kosovichev (born 1953), solar physicist and helioseismologist, has worked at the Crimean Astrophysical Observatory and at Stanford University. The naming also honors his wife, Tatiana Vladimirovna Kosovicheva, a doctor who worked in the Crimean Astrophysical Observatory's medical office || 
|-id=340
| 8340 Mumma ||  || Michael J. Mumma (born 1941), a researcher at NASA's Goddard Space Flight Center, has identified water, methanol, methane, acetylene and ethane in the infrared spectra of comets, and his work on comets as x-ray objects has helped provide a new probe for the solar wind. || 
|-id=343
| 8343 Tugendhat ||  || Villa Tugendhat is one of the most magnificent pieces of modern Czech architecture located in Brno. It was built by Mies van der Rohe in 1930 as a family villa of great elegance, following the idea of freely floating space. The name was suggested by J. Ticha. || 
|-id=344
| 8344 Babette || 1987 BB || Babette Whipple (1918–), American teacher, researcher, psychotherapist, and wife of astronomer Fred L. Whipple || 
|-id=345
| 8345 Ulmerspatz ||  || The Ulmer Spatz (sparrow) is a copper statuette originally on top of the roof of the cathedral of Ulm. The legend goes that a sparrow, building its nest, showed the builders of Ulm how to move a large beam through a small entrance door || 
|-id=347
| 8347 Lallaward || 1987 HK || Lalla Ward (born 1951), a British actress and wife of Richard Dawkins. Best known for her role as Romana in the long-running British sci-fi TV series Doctor Who. || 
|-id=348
| 8348 Bhattacharyya || 1988 BX || Jagadish Chandra Bhattacharyya (born 1930), an Indian astronomer and director of the Indian Institute of Astrophysics in Bangalore, participated in the discoveries of the atmosphere of Jupiter III (Ganymede) and the rings of Uranus. Also an eminent solar astronomer, he was director of the Indian Institute of Astrophysics in Bangalore and was instrumental in the completion of the Vainu Bappu telescope at Kavalur. || 
|-id=353
| 8353 Megryan ||  || Meg Ryan (born 1961), an American actress who majored in journalism. She showed her talent in the feature film You've got Mail (1999). || 
|-id=355
| 8355 Masuo ||  || Masuo Tanaka (born 1955), a Japanese Infrared astronomer, is a researcher at the Institute of Astronomy, University of Tokyo. His research interests include excitation of infrared molecular hydrogen emission, ices in molecular clouds, final-stage evolution of massive stars, and mass loss from massive stars. || 
|-id=356
| 8356 Wadhwa ||  || Meenakshi Wadhwa, known as Mini to her friends. Mini's studies of the microdistribution of trace elements in all known martian meteorites have led to a better understanding of the origin of these rocks and have contributed to the igneous history of planet Mars. Her use of extinct and long-lived radioisotopes to decipher the chronology of meteorites is bringing new insights into the formation of a variety of objects from different asteroidal bodies. As Curator of Meteorites, Minerals and Gems at the Field Museum of Natural History, she is actively involved in public education about meteorites and their parent asteroids. Citation prepared by M. S. Robinson at the request of C. S. Shoemaker || 
|-id=357
| 8357 O'Connor ||  || J. Dennis O'Connor (born 1942), internationally acknowledged biological scientist, provost and staunch proponent of research excellence at the Smithsonian Institution, and resolute champion of the programs of the Astrophysical Observatory || 
|-id=358
| 8358 Rickblakley ||  || Rick Blakley (born 1949), mechanical, structural and optical engineer who has designed instrumentation for several large telescopes including the stereomicroscope used by the Shoemaker-Levy Double Cometograph || 
|-id=367
| 8367 Bokusui ||  || Bokusui Wakayama (1885–1928), one of the most beloved of Japanese poets. Born in a village in Miyazaki Prefecture, he graduated from the nearby Nobeoka Middle School and later from Waseda University. Fond of both travel and sake, he wrote many poems about the joys and sorrows of life and nature. After his death, his complete works were published in 13 volumes. Name proposed by the discoverer following a suggestion by R. Ukishima and T. Sato. || 
|-id=368
| 8368 Lamont || 1991 DM || Johann von Lamont (1805–1879) was born in Scotland but moved to Bavaria to be educated. He became director of the Bogenhausen Observatory and Astronomer Royal of Bavaria. Initially studying positional astronomy, he later developed a network of meteorological and magnetic stations throughout Europe. || 
|-id=369
| 8369 Miyata || 1991 GR || Takashi Miyata (born 1971), an associate professor of astronomy at the Institute of Astronomy, University of Tokyo. || 
|-id=370
| 8370 Vanlindt ||  || Marianne Van Lindt (born 1941) is a well-known Belgian artist of impressionistic aquarels and oil paintings. Her home in Antwerp is a place of social encounters among artists, scientists and musicians || 
|-id=371
| 8371 Goven ||  || Goven, a village in Brittany, France, is the home of the Bernardinis, who were an extraordinary host family for the discoverer during his year-long stay there. Jean-Paul Bernardini served as a navigator in the French Marine during the 1960s, frequently practising the dying art of celestial navigation || 
|-id=373
| 8373 Stephengould || 1992 AB || Stephen Jay Gould (1941–2002) was a biologist, geologist and historian of science at Harvard, but he may be best known for his long-running series of reflective articles in Natural History in which he has articulated his view of evolution. In 1972, working with Niles Eldredge, he developed his idea of "punctuated equilibrium". || 
|-id=374
| 8374 Horohata ||  || Horohata is an open area in Ishikawa town, Fukushima prefecture, 250 km north of Tokyo. A large star party is held there each autumn || 
|-id=375
| 8375 Kenzokohno ||  || Kenzo Kohno (born 1934), Japanese staff member of Akashi Planetarium since 1960 and its director from 1982 to 1995. He served as president of the Japan Planetarium Society from 1983 to 1984. In 1981, he was awarded the Minister's Prize by the Japanese Ministry of Education. Name proposed by the discoverer following a suggestion by T. Sato and A. Fujii. || 
|-id=377
| 8377 Elmerreese ||  || Elmer J. Reese (born 1919), American amateur astronomer, was an important contributing observer in the early years of the Association of Lunar and Planetary Observers, serving on its volunteer staff. His hypothesis of subsurface sources to explain the South Equatorial belt disturbances at the cloud deck on Jupiter is well known || 
|-id=378
| 8378 Sweeney ||  || Donal F. Sweeney (born 1933) was director of the Jet Propulsion Laboratory's Occupational Health Services during 1990–2000 || 
|-id=379
| 8379 Straczynski ||  || J. Michael Straczynski (born 1954), creator, executive producer, and writer of Babylon 5, an award-winning science-fiction novel for television that chronicles the story of the last of a series of space stations, the last best hope for peace in the galaxy. Straczynski has been involved in genre television for many years, editing and writing for a number of popular series. He has also published many short stories, an anthology and two fantasy/horror novels. Straczynski's primary criterion for a good science-fiction television series is that it must be good science fiction and good television. With Babylon 5 he succeeded superbly. Name proposed by J. Scotti, W. Bottke and D. Durda. Citation by D. Durda. || 
|-id=380
| 8380 Tooting ||  || Tooting, a suburb of London. Tooting's postal code is SW17. Name suggested by E. Bowell, who lived in Tooting for 13 years as a youngster || 
|-id=381
| 8381 Hauptmann ||  || Gerhart Hauptmann (1862–1946), a German dramatist writer and leading personality in the field of German naturalism. His work frequently depicts social problems and the ups and downs of life, often viewed from his homeland of Silesia. Beginning in 1904, he lived on Hiddensee, a small island in the Baltic Sea, where he was also buried. Hauptmann was honored with the 1912 Nobel Prize in literature. || 
|-id=382
| 8382 Mann ||  || Thomas Mann (1875–1955) and his brother Heinrich Mann (1871–1950), both prominent German writers and social critics, were born in the Hanseatic town of Lübeck. In 1930, Heinrich became director of the section "Art of Creative Writing" of the Prussian Academy of Sciences. Thomas received the 1929 Nobel Prize for literature. After emigrating in 1933, they later settled in the United States. || 
|-id=386
| 8386 Vanvinckenroye ||  || The Vanvinckenroyes are a well-known family of five organists in Antwerp and Limburg. The most famous of them is the composer Jef Vanvinckenroye (born 1939), a very good friend of the discoverer || 
|-id=387
| 8387 Fujimori || 1993 DO || Kenichi Fujimori (born 1934), an amateur astronomer who observes sunspots, faculae and prominences. A formal observer designated by the Sunspot Index Data Center, he served as director of the solar section of the Oriental Astronomical Association from 1971 to 1978. Name proposed by the discoverer following a suggestion by T. Sato and A. Fujii. || 
|-id=391
| 8391 Kring ||  || David A. Kring (born 1961) of the Lunar and Planetary Laboratory is a prolific geologist and meteoriticist who has studied the mineralogy of meteorites and the structure of terrestrial impact craters, particularly the Chicxulub crater, playing an important role in determining its origin and relationship to the K-T extinction event. || 
|-id=393
| 8393 Tetsumasakamoto ||  || Tetsuma Sakamoto (1908–), Japanese agricultural scientist and specialist in sericultural technology, has been an amateur astronomer since 1923. He has enthusiastically observed sunspots, meteors, zodiacal light, the gegenschein and artificial satellites || 
|-id=395
| 8395 Rembaut ||  || Peter Rembaut (1966–1997), industrial engineer at the electronic laboratory at the Royal Observatory at Uccle, who died in 1997. Of great help to the discoverer for improving the software for the Zeiss comparator-measuring device, he was esteemed by everyone at the observatory for his kindness and ability || 
|-id=397
| 8397 Chiakitanaka || 1993 XO ||  (born 1953) is a Japanese astronomical photographer and writer of books and articles in astronomical magazines. His name often appears in the list of judges for stellar photographic contests in magazines. || 
|-id=398
| 8398 Rubbia || 1993 XY || Carlo Rubbia (born 1934), Italian physicist and 1984 Nobel Prize laureate in physics for his decisive contribution to the large project that led to the discovery of the field particles W and Z, communicators of weak interaction. His discovery has supplied a fundamental check of the unified theory of electro-weak interactions. He is the fourth Italian Nobel laureate in physics. || 
|-id=399
| 8399 Wakamatsu || 1994 AD || Ken-ichi Wakamatsu (born 1942) is a professor at Gifu University and serves as the vice-president of the Astronomical Society of Japan. He has studied the structure and dynamics of clusters of galaxies in optical and radio ranges, and he also worked on an 11-m radio telescope for e-VLBI network in Japan || 
|-id=400
| 8400 Tomizo || 1994 AQ || Okamoto Tomizo (born 1933) joined the Tokyo Astronomical Observatory in 1954 to observe the solar corona and flare phenomenon at the Norikura Solar Observatory. After his 1994 retirement, he helped popularize astronomy as a member of the Public Information Office at the National Astronomical Observatory of Japan || 
|}

8401–8500 

|-
| 8401 Assirelli || 1994 DA || Giuseppe Assirelli (1950–1998), an Italian photographer, known for his exhibitions and for his many books of photographs, depicting the beauty of his land, his town, his river and his people. || 
|-id=403
| 8403 Minorushimizu || 1994 JG || Minoru Shimizu (born 1928) worked at the Tokyo Astronomical Observatory for 40 years, first with the solar-tower telescope at Mitaka (participating in several eclipse expeditions) and later as chief of the technical staff at Okayama. He also worked at Kiso, as well as at public observatories like Bisei, Rikubetsu and Gunma. || 
|-id=405
| 8405 Asbolus || 1995 GO || Asbolus (The "black one") from Greek mythology, was the centaur who supposedly made forecasts from the flight formations of birds. He caused the battle between the centaurs and Heracles and thus was indirectly responsible for the deaths of Pholus and Chiron. || 
|-id=406
| 8406 Iwaokusano || 1995 HJ || Iwao Kusano (1908–1999), an orthopedist and an amateur astronomer. || 
|-id=407
| 8407 Houlahan || 1995 ON || Padraig Houlahan (born 1958), a computer expert at various institutions, lately at Lowell Observatory. || 
|-id=408
| 8408 Strom ||  || Robert G. Strom (born 1933) studied the cratering record on the terrestrial planets and their satellites at the Lunar and Planetary Laboratory. He participated in both crewed and uncrewed exploration of the solar system and has searched for evidence of ancient oceans and ice sheets on Mars. || 
|-id=409
| 8409 Valentaugustus ||  || Valentin Augustus Weber (1867–1940) was a grandfather of the team leader. Born in Germany, he moved to the U.S. in 1889, where he designed and constructed stained-glass windows for cathedrals and mahogany furniture for his friends and neighbors in Brooklyn, New York. || 
|-id=410
| 8410 Hiroakiohno ||  || Hiroaki Ohno (born 1948), Japanese director of the Hoshinomura Observatory located in the Fukushima prefecture. || 
|-id=411
| 8411 Celso || 1996 TO || Celso Macor (1925–1998), a poet in the Italian region of Friuli, gave voice to the little things that form our everyday lives. || 
|-id=412
| 8412 Zhaozhongxian ||  || Zhao Zhongxian (born 1941) is a leading physicist and an Academician of the Chinese Academy of Sciences. He has made significant contributions to the study of high temperature superconductivity, and has won many prestigious awards, including the State Preeminent Science and Technology Award of China in 2016. || 
|-id=413
| 8413 Kawakami ||  || Isamu Kawakami (born 1948), a member of Shirakawa Observatory in Japan and Chiro Observatory in Australia. || 
|-id=414
| 8414 Atsuko ||  || Atsuko Tsuji (born 1953), a science journalist from Asahi Shinbun. || 
|-id=416
| 8416 Okada ||  || Yoshiyuki Okada (born 1947), a member of Shirakawa Observatory in Japan and Chiro Observatory in Australia. || 
|-id=417
| 8417 Lancetaylor ||  || Lance Taylor (born 1956) is a science educator who teaches at high school and college in Western Australia. He is a leading member of Chiro Observatory, established and jointly operated by Australian and Japanese amateur astronomers. || 
|-id=418
| 8418 Mogamigawa ||  || Mogami River (Mogami-gawa), the longest river in the discoverer's home prefecture of Yamagata. One of the three wildest rivers in Japan, Mogamigawa has its source in Mt. Azuma, south of Yamagata. It flows north and pours into the Sea of Japan in Sakata City. Called "Mother River", it is very popular in this area. || 
|-id=419
| 8419 Terumikazumi ||  || Terumi Akiyama (born 1947) and Kazumi Akiyama (born 1952), brothers and members of Shirakawa Observatory in Japan and Chiro Observatory in Australia. || 
|-id=420
| 8420 Angrogna || 1996 WQ || Angrogna, an Italian village nestled in the Cottian Alps, Piedmont, where the discoverer's paternal ancestors were born and lived for at least six generations. || 
|-id=421
| 8421 Montanari ||  || Geminiano Montanari (1633–1687), Italian mathematician || 
|-id=422
| 8422 Mohorovičıć ||  || Andrija Mohorovičić (1857–1936), a Croatian Austro-Hungarian seismologist, researched seismic wave propagation and epicenter determination. After the 1909 earthquake in Croatia he determined the discontinuity that divides the crust of the earth and the mantle that today is called MOHO. || 
|-id=423
| 8423 Macao ||  || Macau, the beautiful peninsula near Zhuhai. || 
|-id=424
| 8424 Toshitsumita || 1997 CP || Tsumita Toshi-hisa (born 1924) joined the Solar Physics Division of the Tokyo Astronomical Observatory in 1950 to study and observe the sun. After retiring in 1987, he contributed to the popularization of astronomy as a member of the Public Information Office at the National Astronomical Observatory of Japan. || 
|-id=425
| 8425 Zirankexuejijin ||  || The concatenation Zi Ran, Ke Xue, Ji Jin, or "Nature", "Science", "Fund", is derived from Guo Jia Zi Ran Ke Xue Ji Jin Wei Yuan Hui, "The National Science Foundation of China", which is celebrating its fifteenth anniversary. The Foundation provides support for the Xinglong program. || 
|-id=428
| 8428 Okiko ||  || Okiko Seki (born 1941), a Kochi native wife of Japanese discoverer Tsutomu Seki. || 
|-id=430
| 8430 Florey ||  || Howard Florey (1898–1968), Australian pharmacologist and pathologist who shared the 1945 Nobel Prize for physiology and medicine. || 
|-id=431
| 8431 Haseda ||  || Haseda Kastumi (born 1945) is a Japanese amateur astronomer in Aichi prefecture. During 2000–2002 he discovered the four novae V463 Sct, V1178 Sco, V2540 Oph and V4743 Sgr. He has also discovered 65 new variables, including some Wolf-Rayet stars. || 
|-id=432
| 8432 Tamakasuga ||  || Ryoji Matsumoto (born 1972), Japanese sumo wrestler whose professional name is Tamakasuga. || 
|-id=433
| 8433 Brachyrhynchus || 2561 P-L || Pink-footed goose (Anser brachyrhynchus), a migratory goose, wintering in northwestern Europe || 
|-id=434
| 8434 Columbianus || 6571 P-L || Tundra swan (Cygnus columbianus), the smallest of the Holarctic swans || 
|-id=435
| 8435 Anser || 6643 P-L || Greylag goose (Anser anser), a member of the waterfowl family Anatidae || 
|-id=436
| 8436 Leucopsis || 2259 T-1 || Barnacle goose (Branta leucopsis), medium-sized goose with a white face and black head, neck, and upper breast || 
|-id=437
| 8437 Bernicla || 3057 T-1 || Brent goose (Branta bernicla), a small goose after the Brent System oilfield in North America is named || 
|-id=438
| 8438 Marila || 4825 T-1 || Greater scaup (Aythya marila), a mid-sized diving duck || 
|-id=439
| 8439 Albellus || 2034 T-2 || Smew (Mergellus albellus), a species of duck || 
|-id=440
| 8440 Wigeon || 1017 T-3 || Wigeon (Anas penelope), a dabbling duck || 
|-id=441
| 8441 Lapponica || 4008 T-3 || Bar-tailed godwit (Limosa lapponica), a large wader bird || 
|-id=442
| 8442 Ostralegus || 4237 T-3 || Eurasian oystercatcher (Haematopus ostralegus), a wader in the oystercatcher bird family || 
|-id=443
| 8443 Svecica || 4343 T-3 || Bluethroat (Luscinia svecica), a small passerine bird || 
|-id=444
| 8444 Popovich ||  || Pavel Popovich (1930–2009), was Soviet cosmonaut and specialist in space engineering, participated in the flights of Vostok 4, Soyuz 14 and Salyut 3. He was the first person admitted to the cosmonaut detachment in 1960 and one of the first six candidates selected for training for the first space flights. || 
|-id=445
| 8445 Novotroitskoe ||  || This minor planet is being named on the occasion of the 50th anniversary of the signing of the friendship agreement between Novotroitskyi Raion, the district center of the Kherson Oblast in Ukraine, and the town of Genichesk, Ukraine. || 
|-id=446
| 8446 Tazieff ||  || Haroun Tazieff (1914–1998), Polish-born Belgian and French geologist, volcanologist and writer, was the author of books and films about volcanoes and earthquakes. An outstanding connoisseur of volcanoes, he was one of the best popularizers of earth science. || 
|-id=447
| 8447 Cornejo || 1974 OE || Antonio Cornejo, Argentinian founder and director of the Galileo Galilei planetarium in Buenos Aires || 
|-id=448
| 8448 Belyakina ||  || Tamara Sergeevna Belyakina (born 1934), astrophysicist and stellar photometrist who worked at the Crimean Astrophysical Observatory from 1955 to 1990. She is known for her multicolor photometric observations of symbiotic stars. She first discovered nonradial pulsations of red giants in such systems and proposed the interpretation of this phenomenon. || 
|-id=449
| 8449 Maslovets ||  || Bogdan Pavlovich Maslovets (born 1940), an electrical engineer at Zaporozhye Transformer Works in Ukraine, began his career at this plant in 1962 as a foreman and later become one of the leaders of the enterprise. || 
|-id=450
| 8450 Egorov ||  || Vsevolod Aleksandrovich Egorov (1930–2001) was one of the founders of the modern theory of the space flight dynamics. One of the leading researchers at the Keldysh Institute of Applied Mathematics and a professor at Moscow University, he was a pioneer in studying trajectories from the earth to the moon. || 
|-id=451
| 8451 Gaidai ||  || Leonid Gaidai (1923–1993), a prominent Soviet film producer and Peoples' Artist of the U.S.S.R. || 
|-id=452
| 8452 Clay || 1978 WB || Landon and Livinia Clay, steadfast friends of science and the arts, Harvard University and the Smithsonian Institution. They are in particular enthusiastic and penetratingly knowledgeable supporters of astronomy, conservation biology and mathematics. || 
|-id=454
| 8454 Micheleferrero ||  || Michele Ferrero (1925–2015), an Italian entrepreneur, who put proceeds of his success into a foundation active in the fields of welfare, culture and art. || 
|-id=455
| 8455 Johnrayner ||  || John T. Rayner (born 1954), an astronomer at the University of Hawaii's Institute for Astronomy and Deputy Director of the NASA Infrared Telescope Facility on Mauna Kea, Hawaii. || 
|-id=456
| 8456 Davegriep ||  || David M. Griep (born 1957) has been a telescope operator for the NASA Infrared Telescope Facility on Mauna Kea, Hawaii, since 1982. || 
|-id=457
| 8457 Billgolisch ||  || William F. Golisch (born 1958) has been a telescope operator for the NASA Infrared Telescope Facility on Mauna Kea, Hawaii, since 1984. || 
|-id=458
| 8458 Georgekoenig ||  || George Koenig (born 1945), the observatory superintendent for the NASA Infrared Telescope Facility on Mauna Kea, Hawaii. || 
|-id=459
| 8459 Larsbergknut ||  || Lars V. Bergknut (born 1947), the observatory foreman and instrument technician for the NASA Infrared Telescope Facility on Mauna Kea, Hawaii. || 
|-id=460
| 8460 Imainamahoe ||  || Imai Namahoe (born 1954), an electronics technician for the NASA Infrared Telescope Facility on Mauna Kea, Hawaii. || 
|-id=461
| 8461 Sammiepung ||  || Sammie J. Pung (born 1958) is a mechanical technician for the NASA Infrared Telescope Facility on Mauna Kea, Hawaii. || 
|-id=462
| 8462 Hazelsears ||  || Hazel Sears (born 1948), managing editor of Meteoritics and Planetary Science (1990–2000) and subsequently Meteorite magazine. || 
|-id=463
| 8463 Naomimurdoch ||  || Naomi Murdoch (born 1984) completed her Ph.D. at The Open University, United Kingdom in 2012. Using microgravity flight experiments and numerical modeling, she investigated the behavior of granular material under minor-planet-like low-gravity surface conditions. || 
|-id=464
| 8464 Polishook ||  || David Polishook (born 1976), Israeli astronomer and a Postdoctoral Fellow at the Massachusetts Institute of Technology and Tel Aviv University. He is also a discoverer of minor planets. || 
|-id=465
| 8465 Bancelin ||  || David Bancelin (born 1978), an astronomer at the "Institut de mécanique céleste et de calcul des éphémérides" at the Paris Observatory. || 
|-id=466
| 8466 Leyrat ||  || Cedric Leyrat (born 1978), an astronomer at the Paris Observatory in Meudon. || 
|-id=467
| 8467 Benoîtcarry ||  || Benoît Carry (born 1983), a Research Fellow at the European Space Astronomy Centre, Spain. His 2009 University of Paris Ph.D. research and ongoing investigations specialize in the physical properties of minor planets as measured from high angular-resolution imaging. || 
|-id=468
| 8468 Rhondastroud ||  || Rhonda M. Stroud (born 1971), a planetary scientist at the Naval Research Laboratory. || 
|-id=470
| 8470 Dudinskaya ||  || Natalya Dudinskaya, Russian ballerina. || 
|-id=471
| 8471 Obrant ||  || The ballet-master, producer and teacher-humanist Arkadij Efimovich Obrant (1906–1974) organized and headed a children's dancing ensemble during the siege of Leningrad in 1942–1945. The first Obrant contest of choreographic art took place in St. Petersburg in March 2002. || 
|-id=472
| 8472 Tarroni || 1983 TC || Gino Tarroni (1958–1986), an Italian amateur astronomer || 
|-id=474
| 8474 Rettig ||  || Terrence W. Rettig (born 1946), a planetary astronomer and educator at the University of Notre Dame. || 
|-id=475
| 8475 Vsevoivanov ||  || Vsevolod Vladimirovich Ivanov (born 1934) is a professor at St. Petersburg University. || 
|-id=477
| 8477 Andrejkiselev ||  || Andrey Kiselyov (1852–1940), a Russian teacher of mathematics. For more than 50 years, pupils in Russian secondary schools learned from his textbooks. His algebra textbook was reprinted 42 times and his geometry textbook 24 times, most recently in 1980. || 
|-id=479
| 8479 Held ||  || Alexander Held (born 1958) has worked on the use of Earth observation data to improve our understanding in landscape ecology and vegetation conditions. He led Australia's international work in Earth Observation, where he provided the necessary rationale towards the establishment of the new Australian Space Agency in 2018. || 
|-id=482
| 8482 Wayneolm ||  || Wayne Olm (born 1943), a science educator for the Green Bay, Wisconsin, public schools and the Wisconsin Space Grant College. || 
|-id=483
| 8483 Kinwalaniihsia ||  || Daryl Baldwin (born 1962), whose traditional name Kinwalaniihsia means hawk in the Myaamia language, is director of the Myaamia Project at Miami University in Ohio. || 
|-id=485
| 8485 Satoru || 1989 FL || Satoru Honda (1913–?), widow of Japanese astronomer Minoru Honda. She was a kindergarten principal, is the widow of Minoru Honda, famed comet and nova hunter. When light pollution affected her husband's observatory at Kurashiki she spent her retirement allowance to purchase a new mountain site. The name was suggested by K. Kenmotsu and T. Sato. || 
|-id=486
| 8486 Asherschel || 1989 QV || Alexander Stewart Herschel (1836–1907) was a British astronomer and professor of natural philosophy at the Universities of Glasgow and Durham, whose studies of meteoric radiant points, the point in the sky from which the paths of meteors appear to originate, was instrumental for identifying comets as the source of meteor showers. The Herschel graph was named after him. || 
|-id=488
| 8488 d'Argens ||  || Jean-Baptiste de Boyer (1703–1771) was a French writer and freethinker who spent 25 years at the court of Frederick II. There he wrote his 18-volume Correspondence philosophique, which helped spread the ideas of the Enlightenment. || 
|-id=489
| 8489 Boulder ||  || The U.S. city of Boulder, Colorado, about 48 km northwest of Denver. Settled in 1859 by miners and named for the large stones in the area, the University of Colorado was founded there in 1876, making Boulder a center for scientific and environmental research. The water supply for the city is unique, coming from the Arapahoe glacier high in the Rocky Mountains. The discoverer and his wife spent a year there at the JILA institution during 1967–1968. || 
|-id=491
| 8491 Joelle-gilles ||  || Joelle (born 1978) and Gilles (born 1980) are the children of Martina Devos and Alain Meerbergen, close friends of the discoverer and his family. || 
|-id=492
| 8492 Kikuoka || 1990 BZ || Hidekazu Kikuoka (born 1941) has been a planetarium educator at the Osaka Municipal Electric Science Museum and at the Science Museum of Osaka. He founded the Japan Astronomical Club in 1955 and served as its president during 1965–1985. The name was suggested by T. Sato and K. Kitao. || 
|-id=493
| 8493 Yachibozu ||  || Yachibozu (tussocks), often seen in the Kushiro Marsh on the island of Hokkaido || 
|-id=494
| 8494 Edpatvega ||  || Ed (born 1931) and Pat (born 1944) Vega have been a dynamic astronomical team for many years. Drawing on his experience as a pathologist, Ed Vega has completed a study, called "Comet Disaster", of the long-term effects to humanity of a large comet's impact on the earth.  || 
|-id=496
| 8496 Jandlsmith ||  || Jim and Laurie Smith in recognition of their generosity and wisdom in the support of forefront tools to explore the heavens to the benefit of all of humanity. Most especially, their support was crucial for Harvard University's participation in the Magellan Project. || 
|-id=498
| 8498 Ufa ||  || Ufa, a large industrial and cultural center in the south Urals. || 
|-id=500
| 8500 Hori || 1990 TU || Gen-Ichiro Hori (born 1930), professor emeritus at Tokyo University. || 
|}

8501–8600 

|-
| 8501 Wachholz ||  || Burkhard Wachholz (1940–2000), a friend of the first discoverer, Lutz D. Schmadel, was longstanding senior chief mechanic and department head at the Institute of Physics, University of Heidelberg. His wealth of ideas and excellent craftmanship, as well as his readiness to help, were indispensable for countless projects. || 
|-id=502
| 8502 Bauhaus ||  || Bauhaus, German architectural school of design founded in 1919 by the architect W. Gropius (1883–1969) in Weimar. The school's philosophy emphasized the unity of fine art and trade as the basis for artistic work. By incorporating engineering, the way was opened for industrial design. The Bauhaus moved to Dessau in 1925 and was closed by the Nazis for its "decadence" in 1932. Many Bauhaus masters emigrated to the United States. In 1937, the New Bauhaus was founded by L. Moholy-Nagy (1895–1946) in Chicago. Name proposed by the first discoverer. || 
|-id=503
| 8503 Masakatsu ||  || Masakatsu Fujimoto (born 1948) played a leading role in constructing a laser interferometric gravitational wave detector, TAMA-300, which is the only interferometric-type detector in operation for gravitational waves emitted by a neutron-star binary or by supernovae in nearby galaxies || 
|-id=515
| 8515 Corvan || 1991 RJ || Patrick G. Corvan (born 1940) has links with Armagh Observatory dating back to his schooldays. He is an avid observer whose enthusiasm for astronomy is readily communicated to others. His book and slide collections, as well as stories about the astronomers who have worked at or visited Armagh, are much in demand. || 
|-id=516
| 8516 Hyakkai ||  || Masaaki Hyakkai (born 1963) is a science teacher and president of Gunma Astronomical Society. As a volunteer lecturer at astronomical observation meetings, he works to popularize science and astronomy || 
|-id=521
| 8521 Boulainvilliers ||  || Henri de Boulainvilliers (1658–1722), French historian and political writer who influenced intellectual developments in the French Enlightenment. Claiming that historical studies can supply the tools for analyzing the present state of society, he worked out a theory of comparative historical study which approached the later writings of Montesquieu. In 1683 he published his l'Idée d'un Système Général de la Nature, which anticipated Holbach's Système de la Nature (1770). His Histoire de la religion et de la philosophie ancienne was published around 1700. || 
|-id=523
| 8523 Bouillabaisse || 1992 PX || Bouillabaisse, a famous French fish soup, the glory of Provençal cooking. It contains fish, shellfish, olive oil, onions, tomatoes, garlic, parsley, saffron, fennel, thyme, bay leaf and orange peel (according to the Marseille recipe). All ingredients must be boiled together quickly. || 
|-id=524
| 8524 Paoloruffini ||  || Paolo Ruffini (1765–1822) an Italian mathematician and physician. In 1799 he published a book on the theory of equations, with the claim that the solution by radicals of a general equation of degree greater of four is impossible. Initially the mathematical community showed no interest in his work. However, in 1821 his work was acknowledged by Cauchy, who was influenced by his investigations and had generalized some of Ruffini's results. Owing to political problems he had to leave his chair in mathematics at Modena and begin a career in medicine, tending to patients from the poorest to the richest. || 
|-id=525
| 8525 Nielsabel ||  || Niels Henrik Abel (1802–1829), a Norwegian mathematician. In 1824 he proved the impossibility of solving a general equation of the fifth degree by radicals. Through his friendship with the editor Crelle, who encouraged him in his work, he wrote his masterpiece Recherches sur les fonctions elliptiques (1827), from which he could prove that Jacobi's work on elliptic integrals were consequences of his own work. It is interesting to note that neither Gauss nor Cauchy showed interest in Abel's work. || 
|-id=526
| 8526 Takeuchiyukou ||  || Yukou Takeuchi (born 1932), Japanese amateur astronomer, designed a quartet camera system with a rotating shutter to measure the velocity of meteors, a system that he later improved to be automatic. In 1990 he began video observation with an image intensifier || 
|-id=527
| 8527 Katayama ||  || Using unparalleled techniques in electron microscopy, Japanese biophysicist Eisaku Katayama (born 1949) revealed molecular shapes of various proteins in their functional states with a resolution that can only be superseded by x-ray study. He also contributed to new techniques in astronomical photography || 
|-id=529
| 8529 Sinzi ||  || Akira M. Sinzi (born 1922) directed the astronomical division of the Hydrographic Department of Japan and was president of IAU Commission 4 during 1979–1982. Although his death has not been confirmed, he disappeared while mountain-climbing alone in the Kanto area in 1995. The name was suggested by A. Sengoku || 
|-id=530
| 8530 Korbokkur ||  || According to the legend of the Ainu people of northern Japan, the members of the Korbokkur tribe were only 3 to 6 cm tall and moved so swiftly they were difficult to see. Satoru Sato began publishing Korbokkur tales in 1959. They are very popular in Japan, and not only for children || 
|-id=531
| 8531 Mineosaito ||  || Mineo Saito (1952–2000) was the founder and an active leader of the Ohkuma Astronomical Club in Kakuda City, Miyagi prefecture. He was devoted to the popularization of astronomical activities || 
|-id=533
| 8533 Oohira || 1993 BM || The Oohira station of Nihondaira Observatory, where this object was discovered, was very active in making observations of comets and minor planets from 1987 to 2000 || 
|-id=534
| 8534 Knutsson ||  || Gösta Knutsson (1908–1973), Swedish author and radio producer who introduced quiz programs to Sweden. His children's stories about the cat Pelle Svanslös and his adventures in Uppsala have been very popular. The author of twelve books, the first in 1939, Knutsson lived not far from the locations where many of the adventures take place. || 
|-id=535
| 8535 Pellesvanslös ||  || Pelle Svanslös (English: Peter No-Tail), a fictional cat that appears in Gösta Knutsson's children's stories. Some of the adventures of this cat, whose tail was bitten off by a rat when he was only a few days old, take place in the section of Uppsala where the astronomical observatory is located. || 
|-id=536
| 8536 Måns ||  || Måns, fictional cat in the stories of Gösta Knutsson. In the stories, Måns, the eternal "bad guy" is always devising new ways of ridiculing Pelle Svanslös over his nonexistent tail. || 
|-id=537
| 8537 Billochbull ||  || Bill and Bull, fictional cats in the stories of Gösta Knutsson. They are dim and fawning cronies of the bad cat Måns. || 
|-id=538
| 8538 Gammelmaja ||  || Gammel-Maja, fictional cat in the stories of Gösta Knutsson. The old and wise cat seldom fails to notice when Pelle is being treated unfairly and often takes his side in arguments. She lives in the belfry of the Uppsala cathedral. || 
|-id=539
| 8539 Laban ||  || Laban, fictional cat in the stories of Gösta Knutsson. He lived in the Observatory park in Uppsala and gave his name to one of the first modern computers at the Astronomical Observatory. || 
|-id=540
| 8540 Ardeberg ||  || Arne Ardeberg (born 1940), Swedish professor emeritus of astronomy at Lund Observatory, was director of the European Southern Observatory at La Silla between 1979 and 1984. He played a very important role in the development of future extremely large telescopes with primary mirrors of aperture 30–50 meters. || 
|-id=541
| 8541 Schalkenmehren ||  || Schalkenmehren is a small German village not far from the city of Daun in the Ardennes (Eifel). A small road leads to the Hoher List Observatory. || 
|-id=543
| 8543 Tsunemi ||  || Hiroshi Tsunemi (born 1951), Osaka University, has worked in x-ray astronomy as a chief scientist of the x-ray observing satellite ASCA. His scientific interest is focused on the structure and chemical composition of supernova remnants and related high-energy phenomena, as well as on the design of new x-ray detectors || 
|-id=544
| 8544 Sigenori || 1993 YE || Sigenori Miyamoto (born 1931) is one of the pioneers of x-ray astronomy in Japan. In 1958, he invented a spark chamber that has been widely used for measuring the path of charged particles. Later, he started studies on x-ray objects and discovered the short time flux variation of x-ray sources || 
|-id=545
| 8545 McGee ||  || Hazel McGee, a British amateur astronomer was meetings secretary of the British Astronomical Association from 1988 to 1993 and has been editor of the association's Journal since 1994, carrying out this task most efficiently and introducing many improvements. She is an enthusiastic observer of variable stars and of stellar occultations by minor planets. || 
|-id=546
| 8546 Kenmotsu ||  || Kunio Kenmotsu (born 1932) has been director of the Kurashiki Observatory since 1990. For many years he was an astronomer in the Hydrographic Department of the Maritime Safety Agency of Japan. He also served successively as director of its hydrographic stations in Shimosato, Kurashiki and Bisei from 1976 to 1989 || 
|-id=548
| 8548 Sumizihara ||  || Sumizi Hara (1878–1968) provided the means for establishing the Kurashiki Observatory in 1926 and for operating it thereafter. The observatory is open to the general public and was the first of its kind in Japan. Hara was awarded many prizes, including "Honorary Citizen of Kurashiki City" || 
|-id=549
| 8549 Alcide || 1994 FS || Alcide Bittesini (1913–1981), father of Luciano Bittesini, one of the Farra d´Isonzo amateur astronomers who discovered this minor planet. A natural sciences high-school teacher in Italy, Alcide Bittesini kindled his then-nine-year-old son's interest in astronomy by showing him a comet, using a handmade telescope constructed from a tin can, a pair of glasses and an eyepiece from his microscope || 
|-id=550
| 8550 Hesiodos ||  || Hesiod (c. 700 BC), an early Greek poet, told the story of Pandora, who out of curiosity opened a jar, letting loose all evils on humanity. In the epic poem Works and Days Hesiod affirms his belief in justice and his feeling for the rhythm of life and nature. || 
|-id=551
| 8551 Daitarabochi ||  || According to myth, the giant Daitarabochi built Mt. Fuji using nearby soil. The area from which he dug became Lake Biwa, the largest lake in Japan. The myth also claims that the many lakes in Japan were the footsteps of Daitarabochi || 
|-id=552
| 8552 Hyoichi || 1995 HE || Hyoichi Kohno (born 1958), Japanese adventurer, born in Ehime prefecture, where this minor planet was discovered. Since 1980, he has boated down the Yukon River; climbed Mt. McKinley (6194 m) and Cerro Aconcagua (6959 m), the highest mountains in North and South America; walked across Patagonia; walked from Los Angeles to New York; walked from Algeria to Togo across the Sahara desert; and so on. In 1997, he became the first Japanese to walk to the North Pole alone || 
|-id=553
| 8553 Bradsmith || 1995 HG || Bradford A. Smith (1931–2018) was an American astronomer who served as the principal investigator of the Imaging Experiment Team of the Voyager missions to the outer planets and has also contributed to many other NASA missions. He has also served as president of IAU Commission 16. || 
|-id=554
| 8554 Gabreta || 1995 KH || Ancient name (first mentioned by Strabo in his Geographica) for the Šumava mountains in the Czech Republic || 
|-id=555
| 8555 Mirimao || 1995 LD || Guido Mirimao (1909–1990), internationally known painter and draftsman. A graphic artist who contributed regularly to newspapers and magazines, from 1931 to 1940 he received a great number of prizes in national exhibitions. He also created art works and murals on sacred subjects in Italy and abroad || 
|-id=556
| 8556 Jana || 1995 NB || Jana Moravcová, wife of Czech astronomer Zdeněk Moravec, who discovered this minor planet || 
|-id=557
| 8557 Šaroun || 1995 OK || the discoverer's father, Jaroslav Šaroun (born 1943). A teacher at the Prague Academy of Musical Arts and a member of the Czech Philharmonic Orchestra, he is a pianist who is always in great demand as an accompanist for Czech and foreign singers. As a lover of astronomy, he influenced and supported his daughter in her desire to become an astronomer. This minor planet was discovered on the day after his birthday || 
|-id=558
| 8558 Hack || 1995 PC || Margherita Hack (1922–2013), Italian astrophysicist, director of the Trieste Astronomical Observatory (1964–1987), director of the astronomy department of Trieste University (1985–1991 and 1996–1997) and a former president of IAU Commission 29. Although her studies ranged from optics and solar physics to radio astronomy (galactic 21-cm emission), her main fields of research were stellar spectroscopy, stellar atmospheres and observable effects of stellar evolution. Her later interests were the ultraviolet and optical spectroscopy of close interacting binaries, atmospheric eclipsing binaries and symbiotic stars. || 
|-id=560
| 8560 Tsubaki ||  || Takio Tsubaki (1935–1999) was a solar physicist concerned particularly with the observational study of the solar corona and prominences. He served as a dean at Shiga University, on the board of the Astronomical Society of Japan and on the Solar Physics Committee at the National Astronomical Observatory || 
|-id=561
| 8561 Sikoruk ||  || Leonid Leonidovich Sikoruk (born 1937) is a Russian astronomy popularizer, telescope builder, astrophotographer and film director in Russia. The name was suggested by forum users on www.astronomy.ru, many of whom became amateur astronomers owing to Leonid Sikoruk. || 
|-id=564
| 8564 Anomalocaris ||  || Anomalocaris ("abnormal shrimp"), a prehistoric animal. The large carnivorous arthropod, was one of the many uniquely shaped multicellular creatures that appeared during the Cambrian explosion. The fossil was first discovered in the Burgess Shale in the Canadian Rocky Mountains. The name was suggested by I. Makino. || 
|-id=568
| 8568 Larrywilson ||  || Lawrence (Larry) Wilson, whom discoverer E. F. Helin has known since his childhood. As the editor of the Pasadena Star News, he has been supportive of the discoverer's work at Caltech's Jet Propulsion Laboratory || 
|-id=569
| 8569 Mameli || 1996 TG || The poet Goffredo Mameli (1827–1849) was the patriotic Italian author of the national anthem Fratelli d´Italia || 
|-id=571
| 8571 Taniguchi || 1996 UX || Yoshiaki Taniguchi (born 1954) works mainly in extragalactic physics at Tohoku University. He promoted the first mid-infrared deep survey for dust-enshrouded young galaxies at high redshift using the Infrared Space Observatory and an optical deep survey for very-high-redshift galaxies using the Subaru Telescope || 
|-id=572
| 8572 Nijo ||  || Nijō Castle, Kyoto, Japan || 
|-id=573
| 8573 Ivanka || 1996 VQ || Ivanka Moravcová, mother of the discoverer Zdeněk Moravec || 
|-id=574
| 8574 Makotoirie ||  || Makoto Irie (born 1939) is known for his outstanding coronal observations with the coronagraph at the Norikura Solar Observatory. He also made countless sunspot drawings at the National Astronomical Observatory of Japan during his service there from 1963 to 2001 || 
|-id=575
| 8575 Seishitakeuchi ||  || Seishi Takeuchi (born 1961) is an amateur astronomer and a painter. He has served as a volunteer artist for the planetarium of Hiroshima Children's Museum for 20 years and has contributed to more than 70 planetarium shows || 
|-id=577
| 8577 Choseikomori ||  || Chosei Komori (born 1935) is a planetary geologist who works as a leader of the Planetary Geological Society of Japan. He is now studying the surface geology of the terrestrial planets and the evolution of the solar system. He is also known as a popularizer of planetary science || 
|-id=578
| 8578 Shojikato || 1996 WZ || Shoji Kato (born 1935), Japanese astrophysicist and professor emeritus of Kyoto University, has been engaged in studying theories concerning oscillations and waves in accretion disks embedded in active galactic nuclei and proto-planetary disks. He served as a member of the Japanese National Committee of the IAU during 1985–1994. || 
|-id=579
| 8579 Hieizan ||  || Hieizan, a Japanese mountain located to the northeast of Kyoto and to the west of Lake Biwa. Enryaku-ji Temple was constructed on the summit of Hieizan in the eighth century. It has played an important role, not only in Buddhism, but also in the history and culture of Japan. || 
|-id=580
| 8580 Pinsky ||  || Robert Pinsky (born 1940), poet laureate of the United States since 1997. Besides several books of poetry, Pinsky has produced a much-acclaimed new English translation of Dante's Inferno. Written in slant rhyme, Pinsky's version captures the rhythm and grandeur of the great Italian poet's masterpiece || 
|-id=581
| 8581 Johnen ||  || Johnen, is a mountain in Nagano prefecture and part of the northern Japanese Alps. Popular with climbers, the 2857-m peak is especially famous because an Englishman, Walter Weston (1861–1940), climbed it in 1894 and spread the word of its beauty all over the world || 
|-id=582
| 8582 Kazuhisa || 1997 AY || Kazuhisa Mishima (born 1970), a Japanese astronomy curator at the Kurashiki Science Center, is an eager planetarium educator who spreads astronomy in an enjoyable way. He makes available predictions for viewing artificial satellites. || 
|-id=583
| 8583 Froberger ||  || Johann Jakob Froberger (1616–1667), German organist and composer of his day. A pupil of Frescobaldi, he combined features of many national styles. His toccate, full of imaginative chromatic harmonies, were copied out and imitated by J. S. Bach. || 
|-id=585
| 8585 Purpurea || 2025 P-L || The purple heron (Ardea purpurea) a wading bird || 
|-id=586
| 8586 Epops || 2563 P-L || The hoopoe (Upupa epops), a colorful bird found across Afro-Eurasia, notable for its distinctive "crown" of feathers. || 
|-id=587
| 8587 Ruficollis || 3078 P-L || The little grebe (Tachybaptus ruficollis), also known as dabchick, a water bird || 
|-id=588
| 8588 Avosetta || 4025 P-L || The pied avocet (Recurvirostra avosetta), a large black and white wading bird || 
|-id=589
| 8589 Stellaris || 4068 P-L || The Eurasian bittern (Botaurus stellaris), a wading bird || 
|-id=590
| 8590 Pygargus || 6533 P-L || The Montagu's harrier (Circus pygargus), a bird of prey of the harrier family || 
|-id=591
| 8591 Excubitor || 6543 P-L || The great grey shrike (Lanius excubitor), also known as the northern shrike, is a large songbird || 
|-id=592
| 8592 Rubetra || 1188 T-1 || The whinchat (Saxicola rubetra), a small migratory passerine bird || 
|-id=593
| 8593 Angustirostris || 2186 T-1 || The marbled duck (Marmaronetta angustirostris), a medium-sized duck || 
|-id=594
| 8594 Albifrons || 2245 T-1 || The little tern (Sterna albifrons), a seabird || 
|-id=595
| 8595 Dougallii || 3233 T-1 || The roseate tern (Sterna dougallii), a seabird || 
|-id=596
| 8596 Alchata || 1298 T-2 || The pin-tailed sandgrouse (Pterocles alchata), a medium large bird in the sandgrouse family. || 
|-id=597
| 8597 Sandvicensis || 2045 T-2 || The Sandwich tern (Sterna sandvicensis), a seabird || 
|-id=598
| 8598 Tetrix || 2202 T-2 || The black grouse (Tetrao tetrix), a large game bird in the grouse family || 
|-id=599
| 8599 Riparia || 2277 T-2 || The sand martin (Riparia riparia), a migratory passerine bird in the swallow family || 
|-id=600
| 8600 Arundinaceus || 3060 T-2 || The great reed warbler (Acrocephalus arundinaceus), a small Eurasian passerine || 
|}

8601–8700 

|-
| 8601 Ciconia || 3155 T-2 || The white stork (Ciconia ciconia) || 
|-id=602
| 8602 Oedicnemus || 2480 T-3 || The stone curlew (Burhinus oedicnemus), a bird also known as dikkops or thick-knees || 
|-id=603
| 8603 Senator || 3134 T-3 || The woodchat shrike (Lanius senator), a small bird and member of the shrike family Laniidae || 
|-id=604
| 8604 Vanier || 1929 PK || Jean Vanier (1928–2019) was a Canadian Catholic philosopher, theologian, and humanitarian. As the founder of two global communities (L'Arche, Faith and Light) for people with intellectual disabilities, he presents a compelling vision of a fully human life, lived in compassionate community. || 
|-id=608
| 8608 Chelomey ||  || Vladimir Chelomey (1914–1984), a Russian designer of space technology, created space systems for Salyut crewed stations and various other applications. || 
|-id=609
| 8609 Shuvalov ||  || Ivan Shuvalov (1727–1797), was a prominent Russian government figure who contributed to the development of Russian science and art and was a patron of scientists, writers and painters. He was a founder and first curator of Moscow University. || 
|-id=610
| 8610 Goldhaber || 1977 UD || Maurice Goldhaber (1911–2011), and his brother, Gerson Goldhaber (1924–2010), two Austrian/German-born American physicist, contributed to 20th-century physics with discoveries that include charmed mesons and photodisintegration of the deuteron. They were still active members of the SuperKamiokande Collaboration and Supernova Cosmology Project at the time of naming. Name suggested by C. Pennypacker. || 
|-id=611
| 8611 Judithgoldhaber ||  || Judith Goldhaber (born 1934), science writer for four decades at Lawrence Berkeley National Laboratory. || 
|-id=612
| 8612 Burov ||  || Andrej Konstantinovich Burov (1900–1957), a Russian architect and inventor. || 
|-id=613
| 8613 Cindyschulz ||  || Cindy Kaye Schulz (born 1969) is the "Technical Lead" of the Lucy mission. || 
|-id=615
| 8615 Philipgrahamgood ||  || Philip Graham Good (born 1961) is the "Guidance, Navigation, and Control Lead" of the Lucy mission, who has also been involved in NASA'S MAVEN, MRO, Stardust and JUNO missions. || 
|-id=616
| 8616 Fogelquist ||  || Rune Fogelquist (1924–2014), Swedish amateur astronomer, for his inspiring activities in astronomy popularization within the Mariestad Astronomy Club, located near Lake Vänern in southern Sweden, and the building and running of the nearby Bifrost Observatory, the main instrument at which is a 0.60-m reflector. The observatory has about 1000 visitors annually. The naming commemorates the twentieth anniversary of the Mariestad Astronomy Club, celebrated in August 1998. Name proposed and citation prepared by H. Rickman (Src). || 
|-id=617
| 8617 Fellous || 1980 PW || Jean-Louis Fellous (born 1947) served as COSPAR Executive Director for over a decade. He was essential to COSPAR's mission to encourage and facilitate international cooperation in space research, particularly when the organization of COSPAR activities was difficult for either internal or external circumstances. || 
|-id=618
| 8618 Sethjacobson || 1981 DX || Seth A. Jacobson (born 1986), a postdoctoral researcher at the Observatoire de Nice. || 
|-id=620
| 8620 Lowkevrudolph ||  || Lowell Kevin Rudolph (born 1950) is the "Spacecraft Design Lead" of the Lucy mission as well as the "Lockheed Martin Proposal Coordinator", who has also been involved in NASA'S Cassini–Huygens, JUNO, and OSIRIS-REx missions. || 
|-id=621
| 8621 Jimparsons ||  || Jim Parsons (born 1973), an American actor who portrays the fictional Caltech theoretical physicist Dr. Sheldon Lee Cooper in the television sitcom "The Big Bang Theory". || 
|-id=622
| 8622 Mayimbialik ||  || Mayim Bialik (born 1975), an American actress and real-life neuroscientist, portrays the fictional neurobiologist Amy Farrah Fowler in the television sitcom "The Big Bang Theory". || 
|-id=623
| 8623 Johnnygalecki ||  || Johnny Galecki (born 1975), an American actor who portrays the fictional Caltech physicist Dr. Leonard Hofstadter in the television sitcom "The Big Bang Theory". || 
|-id=624
| 8624 Kaleycuoco ||  || Kaley Cuoco (born 1985), an American actress who portrays Penny in the television sitcom "The Big Bang Theory". || 
|-id=625
| 8625 Simonhelberg ||  || Simon Helberg (born 1980), an American actor and comedian who portrays the fictional Caltech aerospace engineer Howard Wolowitz in the television sitcom "The Big Bang Theory". || 
|-id=626
| 8626 Melissarauch ||  || Melissa Rauch (born 1980), an American actress and comedian who portrays microbiologist Bernadette Rostenkowski in the television sitcom "The Big Bang Theory". || 
|-id=627
| 8627 Kunalnayyar ||  || Kunal Nayyar (born 1981), a British-born Indian actor who portrays the fictional Caltech astrophysicist Dr. Rajesh Koothrappali in the television sitcom "The Big Bang Theory". || 
|-id=628
| 8628 Davidsaltzberg ||  || David Saltzberg (born 1967) is a professor of physics and astronomy at the University of California, Los Angeles, and science consultant for the television sitcom "The Big Bang Theory". || 
|-id=629
| 8629 Chucklorre ||  || Chuck Lorre (born Charles Michael Levine, 1952) is an American television writer, director, and producer. He is co-creator and executive producer of the situation comedy "The Big Bang Theory". || 
|-id=630
| 8630 Billprady ||  || Bill Prady (born 1960) is an American television writer and producer. He is co-creator and executive producer of the situation comedy "The Big Bang Theory". || 
|-id=631
| 8631 Sherikboonstra ||  || Sheri Klug Boonstra (born 1955) is the lead of L'SPACE, the "Lucy Student Collaboration" for the Lucy mission. She also oversees NASA's "Mars Education Program" and the "Undergraduate Student Research Program". || 
|-id=632
| 8632 Egleston || 1981 FR || Margaret Ericksen Egleston (born 1943), a scientific programmer at the Harvard-Smithsonian Center for Astrophysics since 1984. || 
|-id=633
| 8633 Keisukenagao ||  || Keisuke Nagao (born 1949), a professor at the Geochemical Research Center of the University of Tokyo. || 
|-id=634
| 8634 Neubauer || 1981 GG || Fritz Neubauer (born 1940) is a pioneer in space science. His main fields are planetary magnetic fields and magnetospheres, interplanetary plasma and the interaction of the solar wind with comets. He has been principal and co-investigator on many NASA and ESA space missions. The name was suggested by M. Pätzold. || 
|-id=635
| 8635 Yuriosipov ||  || Yurij Aleksandrovich Osipov (born 1965), a physician at the Bakhchisaraj regional hospital in the Crimea. || 
|-id=636
| 8636 Malvina ||  || Malvina Maury (born 1985), daughter of astronomer Alain Maury who participated in the discovery of this minor planet. Malvina was born on the day of discovery, in Poway, near San Diego, while her father was working at Palomar Observatory. || 
|-id=639
| 8639 Vonšovský ||  || Břetislav Vonšovský (1937–2019) was the chairman of South Bohemian branch of the Czech Astronomical Society. He led Tábor Observatory as an enthusiastic populizer of astronomy for 41 years. He dealt with lectures for schools and general public and was interested in stellar occultations. || 
|-id=640
| 8640 Ritaschulz ||  || Rita Schulz (born 1961), a German planetary scientist at the European Space Agency, is an expert on the physical and chemical properties of comets. She studied the structure of the CN coma of comet 1P/Halley and is currently deputy project scientist on the Rosetta mission. The name was suggested by M. A. Barucci. || 
|-id=642
| 8642 Shawnkerry ||  || Shawn Kerry Moore Bus (born 1956), the wife of the discoverer. || 
|-id=643
| 8643 Quercus || 1988 SC || Quercus, or oak trees, is a genus belonging to the family Fagaceae. The English oak (Quercus robur) reaches a height of 30–40 meters and an age of more than a thousand years. || 
|-id=644
| 8644 Betulapendula || 1988 SD || The silver birch (Betula pendula), a plant species in the genus Betula belonging to the family Betulaceae. It is a beautiful tree with an almost white bark. It grows fast and reaches a height of about 25 meters and an age of 60–80 years. || 
|-id=647
| 8647 Populus || 1989 RG || Populus, a genus of plants including aspen and cottonwood, belongs to the family Salicaceae. Populus nigra (black poplar) is a fast-growing tree with a height of about 30 meters, whereas Populus tremula (trembling aspen) is easily recognizable by its shimmering appearance. || 
|-id=648
| 8648 Salix || 1989 RJ || Salix, known as willows, is a genus belonging to the family Salicaceae. Salix alba (white willow) is a small tree with long, thin leaves. This fast-growing tree is used for windbreaks and screens. Salix caprea (goat or pussy willow) is a fast-growing small tree with striking catkins in early spring. || 
|-id=649
| 8649 Juglans ||  || Juglans or walnut trees, is a genus belonging to the family Juglandaceae Juglans regia (English walnut) produces a particularly delicious fruit. || 
|-id=651
| 8651 Alineraynal ||  || Aline Marie Raynal (born 1937), professor of botany at the Muséum National d´Histoire Naturelle de Paris || 
|-id=652
| 8652 Acacia ||  || Acacia, a genus of shrubs, known as the wattles or acacias, belonging to the family Mimosaceae. Acacia mearnsii (mimosa) is a shrub with feathery leaves composed of many small leaflets. The strongly scented tiny yellow flowers are grouped in loose, rounded clusters. || 
|-id=656
| 8656 Cupressus ||  || Cupressus (cypress), belonging to the family Cupressaceae. Cupressus macrocarpa (Monterrey cypress) produces a durable wood. Cupressocyparis leylandii (Leyland cypress), hybridized from the macrocarpia, has scale-like dark green leaves that are arranged at various angles to the shoot. These trees are typical of the landscape in Tuscany. || 
|-id=657
| 8657 Cedrus ||  || Cedrus (cedar), belonging to the family Pinaceae. Cedrus libani (cedar of Lebanon) has a fruit that is an ovoid upright cone. || 
|-id=660
| 8660 Sano ||  || Yasuo Sano (born 1959), a staff member of the Nayoro Municipal Kihara Observatory || 
|-id=661
| 8661 Ratzinger ||  || Pope Benedict XVI (born 1927), then Joseph Cardinal Ratzinger, a German professor of theology || 
|-id=663
| 8663 Davidjohnston ||  || David Alexander Johnston (1949–1980), an American volcanologist. || 
|-id=664
| 8664 Grigorijrichters ||  || Grigorij Richters (born 1987), a film director and producer, who has worked to increase awareness of the dangers of asteroid impacts on the Earth. In 2014 he founded Asteroid Day, a worldwide organisation centered on identifying all dangerous NEOs and developing ways to avoid an impending catastrophe. || 
|-id=665
| 8665 Daun-Eifel ||  || Daun, a German city in the Eifel region, not far from the Belgian border. Well known for its volcanic lakes and healthy mineral water Dauner Sprudel, it has recently celebrated its 1000th anniversary. || 
|-id=666
| 8666 Reuter ||  || Fritz Reuter (1810–1874), a German poet and social critic. || 
|-id=667
| 8667 Fontane ||  || Theodor Fontane (1819–1898) on the occasion of the 100th anniversary of his death. He brought the German novel to worldwide importance. || 
|-id=668
| 8668 Satomimura || 1991 HM || Satomimura (Satomi village), Ibaraki prefecture, Japan, 150 km north of Tokyo, famous for its starry sky and annual autumn star party || 
|-id=672
| 8672 Morse ||  || Samuel F. B. Morse (1791–1872), an American painter and inventor who in 1838 developed the code of dots and dashes that now bears his name. || 
|-id=676
| 8676 Lully ||  || Jean-Baptiste Lully (1632–1687), an Italian-French composer, created a very lively style of composition by introducing quicker dances such as the bourrée, gavotte and gigue into his ballets. A beautiful example of his music is La Marche des Combattans. || 
|-id=677
| 8677 Charlier ||  || Carl Charlier (1862–1934), Swedish professor of astronomy at Uppsala during 1890–1897 and later at Lund, worked in several fields of astronomy, including celestial mechanics and photometry. He was one of the leading founders of stellar statistics, applying mathematical statistics to astronomical problems. || 
|-id=678
| 8678 Bäl ||  || Bäl, is a small and typical country parish on the Swedish island of Gotland, often associated on Gotland with the well-known song "Farewell to Bäl". || 
|-id=679
| 8679 Tingstäde ||  || Tingstäde, is a parish on Gotland. In Tingstäde Träsk, a swamp that is the second largest lake on the island, the remains of a timber construction involving some 10~000 logs, probably from the sixth century, is still visible on the lake floor. || 
|-id=680
| 8680 Rone ||  || Rone, a small parish on Gotland, Sweden, is well known for the lyrics to the song Rune from Rone. Nearby Uggarde Rojr, a 3000-year-old burial mound from the Bronze Age with a diameter of 50 meters and a height of 7 meters, is one of the biggest in Sweden. || 
|-id=681
| 8681 Burs ||  || Burs is a small parish on the Swedish island of Gotland. Gustav Edman (1881–1912), well known for his height (2.46 meters) and strength, was born in Burs. Burs also has the remains of the largest house (67 × 11 meters) in Sweden from the Roman Iron Age. || 
|-id=682
| 8682 Kräklingbo ||  || Kräklingbo, is a small parish on the Swedish island of Gotland. Located here on a hill are the remains of a fortification nearly 2000 years old, the biggest in Scandinavia. From that hill many of the medieval churches on the island can be seen. || 
|-id=683
| 8683 Sjölander ||  || Nils Göran Sjölander (born 1951), a Swedish astronomer and formerly librarian at Uppsala Observatory, studies dwarf galaxies and has a keen interest in the history of astronomy. || 
|-id=684
| 8684 Reichwein ||  || Adolf Reichwein (1898–1944), resistance fighter in Nazi Germany || 
|-id=685
| 8685 Fauré ||  || Gabriel Fauré (1845–1924) was a French composer who revolutionized French music by using daring harmonic progressions and modulations. A set of highly original nocturnes, barcaroles and impromptus was composed after the example of Chopin. His Ballade (1881) for piano is very popular. || 
|-id=686
| 8686 Akenside ||  || Mark Akenside (1721–1770), a British poet and physician who studied medicine at the University of Leiden. There he met the French philosopher d'Holbach, who translated his well-known philosophical essay The Pleasures of Imagination (1744) into French (1759). || 
|-id=687
| 8687 Caussols || 1992 PV || The observatory at Caussols, in the French Alps-Maritimes, is situated above the northern part of a 1100-m high, open and flat plain, the Plateau de Caussols, about 10 km from the Route Napoléon. || 
|-id=688
| 8688 Delaunay ||  || Charles-Eugène Delaunay (1816–1872), a French mathematician and astronomer. || 
|-id=690
| 8690 Swindle ||  || Timothy D. Swindle (born 1955), of the Lunar and Planetary Laboratory, is a meteoriticist who has specialized in the study of noble gases in meteorites. Swindle has used meteorites, including the martian meteorites, to study the atmospheres of other planets and water products in the Solar System. || 
|-id=691
| 8691 Etsuko ||  || Etsuko Kobayashi (born 1926), the first female lecturer at the Gotoh Planetarium and Astronomical Museum in Tokyo. || 
|-id=693
| 8693 Matsuki ||  || Noboru Matsuki (born 1934), a Japanese amateur astronomer who has accumulated a huge amount of observational data on sunspots since 1958. || 
|-id=695
| 8695 Bergvall ||  || Nils Bergvall (born 1945), Swedish astronomer at Uppsala Observatory, studies galaxy evolution and is also interested in music. || 
|-id=696
| 8696 Kjeriksson ||  || Kjell Eriksson (born 1948), a Swedish astronomer and director of Uppsala Observatory, where he studies stellar atmospheres. || 
|-id=697
| 8697 Olofsson ||  || Kjell Olofsson (born 1955), a Swedish astronomer who studies galaxies. He is the director of undergraduate studies at the Uppsala Observatory and studies galaxies. || 
|-id=698
| 8698 Bertilpettersson ||  || Bertil Pettersson (born 1945), a Swedish astronomer studies star formation, especially T Tauri stars and Herbig–Haro objects. He is also the system manager at the Uppsala Observatory. || 
|-id=700
| 8700 Gevaert ||  || Lieven Gevaert (1868–1935) was a Flemish Belgian industrialist who established the L. Gevaert & Cie at Mortsel, near Antwerp, beginning in 1890 with a small shop of homemade photographical paper, which later became Agfa-Gevaert corporation. Gevaert glass plates have been used for many purposes in astronomy, especially for the astrometry of minor planets. || 
|}

8701–8800 

|-id=702
| 8702 Nakanishi ||  || Akio Nakanishi (born 1964), Japanese astrophotographer and member of Mount Nyukasa station, where this minor planet was discovered. He is also a discoverer of minor planets. || 
|-id=703
| 8703 Nakanotadao ||  || Tadao Nakano (born 1926), Osaka City University, proposed in 1953 the so-called Nakano-Nishijima-Gell-Man rule of the statistics of elementary particles, which became one of the foundations of the quark model. His interests also extend to general relativity and to gauge theory. || 
|-id=704
| 8704 Sadakane || 1993 YJ || Kozo Sadakane (born 1947), Osaka Kyoiku University, is an expert on the analysis of stellar spectra. || 
|-id=706
| 8706 Takeyama || 1994 CM || Haruo Takeyama (1915–), Japanese physicist and astronomy enthusiast || 
|-id=707
| 8707 Arakihiroshi ||  || Hiroshi Araki (born 1935), Japanese amateur astronomer || 
|-id=709
| 8709 Kadlu ||  || Kadlu, the Eskimo thunder-goddess was originally a little girl who played so noisily that her parents told her and her sisters to go outside to play. || 
|-id=710
| 8710 Hawley ||  || Walter N. Hawley, physics and astronomy teacher at Saint Paul's School in Concord, New Hampshire and director of the school observatory there, and friend of the discoverer || 
|-id=711
| 8711 Lukeasher || 1994 LL || Luke Asher Hergenrother (born 2010),a son of the discoverer. || 
|-id=712
| 8712 Suzuko ||  || Suzuko Hurukawa (born 1935), wife of astronomer Kiichirou Hurukawa || 
|-id=713
| 8713 Azusa ||  || Azusa Hurukawa (born 1968), the daughter of astronomer Kiichirou Hurukawa. || 
|-id=716
| 8716 Ginestra ||  || Giacomo Leopardi (1798–1837), the great poet and philosopher from the Italian Romantic period. Full of astronomical references, his poetry expresses the great sense of bewilderment of post-Copernican man, faced with an infinite variety of worlds of which he is no longer the center, but only infinitesimal and marginal. Nevertheless, the Ginestra becomes the symbol of man/flower in the middle of the cosmos/desert, a cosmos sustained by rigid mechanistic laws, indifferent to every desire and human sentiment, existing only to perpetuate the cycle of production and universal destruction. Name suggested and citation prepared by M. Vicoli. || 
|-id=717
| 8717 Richviktorov ||  || Richard Viktorov (1929–1983), a Soviet director best known for his fantasy film Moscow-Cassiopeia || 
|-id=719
| 8719 Vesmír || 1995 VR || Vesmír, a Czech monthly journal of science founded in 1871. It describes new findings from the whole spectrum of science including astronomy, biology, chemistry, cybernetics, genetics, geology, medicine and physics, as well as their interdisciplinary connections. || 
|-id=720
| 8720 Takamizawa ||  || Kesao Takamizawa (born 1952), one of the most renowned amateur astronomers in Japan. || 
|-id=721
| 8721 AMOS ||  || Air Force Maui Optical and Supercomputing observatory (AMOS, originally the Air Force Maui Optical Station) || 
|-id=722
| 8722 Schirra ||  || Wally Schirra, (born 1923), the only astronaut to command Mercury, Gemini and Apollo spacecraft. || 
|-id=723
| 8723 Azumayama ||  || Azumayama, a volcanic mountain range that forms the border between the Fukushima and Yamagata prefecture in the northern part of mainland Japan. || 
|-id=724
| 8724 Junkoehara ||  || Junko Ehara (born 1957), Japanese cellist and amateur astronomer || 
|-id=725
| 8725 Keiko ||  || Keiko Morinaga (born 1969), a member of the Matsue Astronomy Club and the wife and observing partner of the discoverer. || 
|-id=726
| 8726 Masamotonasu ||  || Masamoto Nasu (born 1942), Japanese author and president of the Japanese Association of Writers for Children || 
|-id=728
| 8728 Mimatsu ||  || Masao Mimatsu (1888–1977), a Japanese postmaster and an amateur volcanologist. || 
|-id=729
| 8729 Descour ||  || Anne S. Descour (born 1968), an imaginative and energetic computer scientist at the University of Arizona's Lunar and Planetary Laboratory. || 
|-id=730
| 8730 Iidesan ||  || Iidesan mountain range and national park, which forms the borders between Fukushima, Niigata and Yamagata prefectures in northern mainland Japan || 
|-id=731
| 8731 Tejima || 1996 WY || Seiichi Tejima, 19th–20th-century Japanese education advocate, who contributed to the development of what is now the National Science Museum of Japan and founder of what is now Kyoritsu Women's University || 
|-id=732
| 8732 Champion ||  || Frank L. Champion (1884–1917), an American aviator. || 
|-id=733
| 8733 Ohsugi ||  || Takashi Ohsugi (born 1944), currently director of the Hiroshima Astrophysical Science Center, is an expert on the development of semiconductor detectors for high-energy astrophysics. He developed silicon sensors for the LAT instrument on the Fermi Gamma-ray Space Telescope || 
|-id=734
| 8734 Warner || 1997 AA || Brian D. Warner, American astronomer, discoverer of minor planets and publisher of the Minor Planet Observer monthly newsletter. || 
|-id=735
| 8735 Yoshiosakai ||  || Sakai Yoshio (1923–2002) is a Japanese pioneer in building astronomical observatories for the general public. He established the Hidahiko Tenmondai at his own expense. He also toiled as director of Ogawa Astronomical Observatory (founded in 1991), contributing much to education in astronomy. || 
|-id=736
| 8736 Shigehisa ||  || Osao Shigehisa (born 1936) a Japanese astronomer, who has actively observed variable stars since 1952. An enthusiastic recorder of the activities of Japanese amateur astronomers, he played an important role in compiling a History of Amateur Astronomy in Japan in 1987, as well as a sequel in 1994. || 
|-id=737
| 8737 Takehiro ||  || Takehiro Hayashi (born 1951) is a Japanese professor at Hiroshima University. His main research field is education in astronomy and earth science, and he has given children, students and adults alike many opportunities to observe celestial objects with telescopes. || 
|-id=738
| 8738 Saji ||  || Saji Observatory, located in Saji, Tottori, Japan. With its 1.03-m telescope, is situated on a hill overlooking Saji village. Saji's 3200 residents constructed their observatory in 1994, and the village assembly adopted a rule of keeping the skies dark. || 
|-id=739
| 8739 Morihisa ||  || Morihisa Suzuki (born 1944), Japanese petrologist and meteoricist || 
|-id=740
| 8740 Václav ||  || Wenceslaus I, Duke of Bohemia (c. 907–935), a medieval child ruler and Czech Roman Catholic saint. The naming also honors his descendants. || 
|-id=741
| 8741 Suzukisuzuko ||  || Suzuko Suzuki, 20th-century Japanese poet and amateur astronomer || 
|-id=742
| 8742 Bonazzoli ||  || Roberto Bonazzoli (1940–1996), a friend of the discoverer. || 
|-id=743
| 8743 Kèneke ||  || Kèneke is Flemish for "small child", and it is only from her photographs that the discoverer knows and remembers his elder sister, Virginia Margaretha Anna Elst (1930–1935), who died from meningitis before he was born. || 
|-id=744
| 8744 Cilla ||  || Priscilla Annette (1994–1998), niece of Lincoln Laboratory staff member Colleen Cilley. || 
|-id=745
| 8745 Delaney ||  || William P. Delaney, director's fellow at M.I.T. Lincoln Laboratory. This is a donation of the fruit of an optical search program to an expert in radar. || 
|-id=747
| 8747 Asahi ||  || Asahi, the mountain range forming the border between Niigata and Yamagata prefectures in the northern part of mainland Japan. Meaning "morning sun", the name is also that of several Japanese towns and villages, as well as of another mountain range. || 
|-id=749
| 8749 Beatles ||  || The Beatles, the great 1960s British popular rock group from Liverpool comprised John Lennon, Paul McCartney, George Harrison and Ringo Starr. They are unequalled in the rock era as prolific songwriters and innovative recording artists with George Martin. || 
|-id=750
| 8750 Nettarufina || 2197 P-L || The red-crested pochard (Netta rufina), a bird || 
|-id=751
| 8751 Nigricollis || 2594 P-L || The black-necked grebe (Podiceps nigricollis), a bird || 
|-id=752
| 8752 Flammeus || 2604 P-L || The short-eared owl (Asio flammeus), a bird || 
|-id=753
| 8753 Nycticorax || 2636 P-L || The black-crowned night heron (Nycticorax nycticorax), a bird || 
|-id=754
| 8754 Leucorodia || 4521 P-L || The spoonbill (Platalea leucorodia), a bird || 
|-id=755
| 8755 Querquedula || 4586 P-L || The garganey (Anas querquedula), a bird || 
|-id=756
| 8756 Mollissima || 6588 P-L || The common eider (Somateria mollissima), a bird || 
|-id=757
| 8757 Cyaneus || 6600 P-L || The hen harrier (Circus cyaneus), a bird || 
|-id=758
| 8758 Perdix || 6683 P-L || The grey partridge (Perdix perdix), a bird || 
|-id=759
| 8759 Porzana || 7603 P-L || The crakes (Porzana), a genus of birds || 
|-id=760
| 8760 Crex || 1081 T-1 || The corncrake (Crex crex), a bird || 
|-id=761
| 8761 Crane || 1163 T-1 || The cranes (Grus), a genus of birds || 
|-id=762
| 8762 Hiaticula || 3196 T-1 || The ringed plover (Charadrius hiaticula), a bird || 
|-id=763
| 8763 Pugnax || 3271 T-1 || The ruff (Philonachus pugnax), a bird || 
|-id=764
| 8764 Gallinago || 1109 T-2 || The snipes (Gallinago), a genus of birds || 
|-id=765
| 8765 Limosa || 1274 T-2 || The godwits (Limosa), a genus of birds || 
|-id=766
| 8766 Niger || 1304 T-2 || The Niger River, West Africa; several birds and plants also have niger ("black") as a species epithet, e.g. the black tern Chlidonias niger. || 
|-id=767
| 8767 Commontern || 1335 T-2 || The common tern, a bird. || 
|-id=768
| 8768 Barnowl || 2080 T-2 || The barn owl, a bird. || 
|-id=769
| 8769 Arctictern || 2181 T-2 || The Arctic tern, a bird. || 
|-id=770
| 8770 Totanus || 3076 T-2 || The common redshank Tringa totanus (a bird). || 
|-id=771
| 8771 Biarmicus || 3187 T-2 || The bearded tit Panurus biarmicus (a bird). || 
|-id=772
| 8772 Minutus || 4254 T-2 || Several birds have minutus ("small") as a species epithet, e.g. the little gull Larus minutus. || 
|-id=773
| 8773 Torquilla || 5006 T-2 || The wryneck Jynx torquilla (a bird). || 
|-id=774
| 8774 Viridis || 5162 T-2 || The green woodpecker Picus viridis (a bird). || 
|-id=775
| 8775 Cristata || 5490 T-2 || Several birds have cristatus ("crested") as a species epithet, e.g. the crested tit Parus cristatus. || 
|-id=776
| 8776 Campestris || 2287 T-3 || Several birds and plants have campestris ("of fields") as a species epithet, e.g. the tawny pipit Anthus campestris. || 
|-id=777
| 8777 Torquata || 5016 T-3 || Several birds have torquata ("collared") as a species epithet. || 
|-id=780
| 8780 Forte || 1975 LT || Juan Carlos Forte (born 1949), Argentinian astronomer, has conducted most of his professional work at the La Plata Observatory. His main field of research is the galactic and extragalactic system of globular clusters, an area to which he has contributed over 120 refereed papers. || 
|-id=781
| 8781 Yurka ||  || Yuri Sergeevich Efimov (born 1935), an astrophysicist. || 
|-id=782
| 8782 Bakhrakh ||  || Lev Davidovich Bakhrakh (born 1921), a corresponding member of the Russian Academy of Sciences. || 
|-id=783
| 8783 Gopasyuk ||  || Stepan Il'ich Gopasyuk (born 1930), a leading scientist at the Crimean Astrophysical Observatory. || 
|-id=785
| 8785 Boltwood ||  || Paul Boltwood (born 1943), a Canadian computer scientist and amateur astronomer. He monitored the peculiar object OJ 287 for some two years. He also obtained deep-sky CCD images with limiting magnitude 24.5 using a home-built 0.4-m reflector. || 
|-id=786
| 8786 Belskaya ||  || Irina N. Belskaya, Ukrainian astronomer at the Kharkov Astronomical Observatory  and a friend of the discoverer, Claes-Ingvar Lagerkvist. Her research focuses on the spin and surface properties of main-belt minor planets, in particular of M-type asteroids. She has made important contributions in this field by combining photometric and polarimetric observations with optical laboratory measurements of the analogous asteroidal materials || 
|-id=787
| 8787 Ignatenko ||  || Vitalij Nikitich Ignatenko (born 1941), Russian journalist and film script-writer. || 
|-id=788
| 8788 Labeyrie ||  || Catherine Labeyrie, a French astronomer and hypersentitisation expert of the 0.9-meter Schmidt telescope at CERGA Observatory, as well as Antoine Labeyrie, a French optician and astronomer. || 
|-id=789
| 8789 Effertz ||  || Mark Joseph Effertz (born 1977) is the "Mission Operations Spacecraft Engineer" of the Lucy mission. || 
|-id=790
| 8790 Michaelamato ||  || Michael J. Amato (born 1967) was leading the "Early Mission Proposal" and the "Phase A" of the Lucy mission at Goddard Space Flight Center. He is also involved in NASA's OSIRIS-REx, MAVEN, Dragonfly, and DAVINCI+ missions. || 
|-id=791
| 8791 Donyabradshaw ||  || Donya Douglas–Bradshaw (born 1970) is the Project Manager of both the Lucy mission and the "Advanced Topographic Laser Altimeter System" (ATLAS) of the ICESat-2 satellite. || 
|-id=792
| 8792 Christyljohnson ||  || Christyl Chamblee Johnson (born 1967) is the "Deputy Director for Technology and Research Investments" at the Goddard Space Flight Center who has overseen and supported the formulation of the Lucy mission. || 
|-id=793
| 8793 Thomasmüller || 1979 QX || Thomas G. Müller, a German astronomer, for his contribution to the study of minor planets in the thermal infrared. His observational work includes mid- to far-infrared photometry, spectroscopy and polarimetry with the Infrared Space Observatory. He has developed and applied various thermophysical models and techniques, in order to derive physical properties of minor planets. Because of the great accuracy he achieved, future telescope projects in the infrared will also benefit from these efforts, since minor planets are well suited as calibration targets, Name proposed and citation prepared by J. S. V. Lagerros. || 
|-id=794
| 8794 Joepatterson ||  || Joseph Otis Patterson III (born 1946), a professor of astronomy at Columbia University. || 
|-id=795
| 8795 Dudorov ||  || Alexander Egorovich Dudorov (born 1946), an astrophysicist at Chelyabinsk State University. || 
|-id=796
| 8796 Sonnett ||  || Sarah Sonnett (born 1984), a postdoctoral fellow at the Jet Propulsion Laboratory. || 
|-id=797
| 8797 Duffard ||  || Rene Duffard (born 1971), a postdoctoral research scientist at the Instituto Astrofisica Andalucia in Granada, Spain. || 
|-id=798
| 8798 Tarantino ||  || Frederick A. Tarantino (born 1955), president of the Universities Space Research Association. || 
|-id=799
| 8799 Barnouin ||  || Olivier Barnouin (born 1967), a scientist at the Johns Hopkins University Applied Physics Laboratory. || 
|-id=800
| 8800 Brophy ||  || John R. Brophy (born 1956), a Principal Engineer at the Jet Propulsion Laboratory. || 
|}

8801–8900 

|-
| 8801 Nugent ||  || Carolyn R. Nugent (born 1984), a postdoctoral researcher at the Jet Propulsion Laboratory. || 
|-id=802
| 8802 Negley ||  || Scott Negley Jr. (born 1939) is a long-time educator of astronomy. Through his work as a high school planetarium director, he motivated several students to actively pursue a career in astronomy and physics. || 
|-id=803
| 8803 Kolyer ||  || Deborah E. Schwartz Kolyer (born 1960), a supporting manager of science at the SETI Institute for 28 years. || 
|-id=804
| 8804 Eliason ||  || Eric M. Eliason (born 1949), an American expert in image-processing techniques and image analysis for the U.S. Geological Survey's Astrogeologic Team, has used this expertise for data restoration and publishing activities in support of the Voyager and Mars Observer projects and the Clementine Mission to the Moon. || 
|-id=805
| 8805 Petrpetrov ||  || Petr Petrovich Petrov (born 1945), a Ukrainian astrophysicist and leading scientist at the Crimean Astrophysical Observatory, is widely known for his work on the variability of young stars having solar mass. He investigated magnetic and accretive activity in T Tauri stars and developed a concept for the magnetic activity of young stars. || 
|-id=806
| 8806 Fetisov ||  || Viacheslav Fetisov (born 1958), an outstanding Russian sportsman, ice-hockey player and champion of two Olympic Games. || 
|-id=807
| 8807 Schenk ||  || Paul M. Schenk (born 1958), a planetary geologist at the Lunar and Planetary Institute, Houston. || 
|-id=808
| 8808 Luhmann ||  || Janet G. Luhmann (born 1946), a Senior Space Fellow at the University of California Berkeley. || 
|-id=809
| 8809 Roversimonaco ||  || Fabio Roversi Monaco (born 1938), the rector of the University of Bologna since 1985. || 
|-id=810
| 8810 Johnmcfarland ||  || John McFarland (born 1948) has made a major contribution to promoting astronomy at Armagh Observatory. He is well known for his knowledge of astronomy and his short biography of Kenneth Essex Edgeworth, the Irish astronomer who predicted the Edgeworth-Kuiper belt. || 
|-id=811
| 8811 Waltherschmadel ||  || Heinrich Erwin Walther Schmadel (1902–1944), German journalist and editor-in-chief of several newspapers. He was killed in World War II in Russia near Stalingrad. His story is only an example of the common tragedy between Germans and Russians. There are thousands of people who never saw their fathers. Among these is Walther's son, astronomer Lutz D. Schmadel. This planet is a sign of understanding, friendship and forgiveness for us all. || 
|-id=812
| 8812 Kravtsov ||  || Yurij Fedorovich Kravtsov, Ukrainian pilot and writer. || 
|-id=813
| 8813 Leviathan ||  || The Leviathan of Parsonstown, the nickname of the great reflecting telescope at Birr Castle, County Offaly, Ireland. || 
|-id=814
| 8814 Rosseven || 1983 XG || William Brendan Parsons, Seventh Earl of Rosse (born 1936). || 
|-id=815
| 8815 Deanregas || 1984 DR || Dean Regas (born 1973) has been Cincinnati Observatory Center's outreach astronomer since 2000 and an educator to thousands. || 
|-id=816
| 8816 Gamow ||  || George Gamow (1904–1968), a Soviet-American theoretical physicist and cosmologist. His main scientific achievements include the creation of alpha and beta decay theory and the theory of the exploding Universe. Gamow was also the first to decipher the genetic code. He worked at institutions around the world, in Odessa, Leningrad, Göttingen, Copenhagen, Cambridge, as well as in the U.S. Through his popular lectures, articles and books he promoted public interest in science. In 1956 he received the Calling Prize awarded by UNESCO for the popularization of science. Name suggested by S. P. Kapitza and supported by the discoverer. || 
|-id=817
| 8817 Roytraver ||  || Roy Traver, American photographer, philosopher, teacher, innovator, gourmet cook, and friend of the discoverers || 
|-id=818
| 8818 Hermannbondi ||  || Hermann Bondi (1919–2005), a British cosmologist, known for work on the steady-state theory of the universe, had an impressive career that encompassed mathematics, radar technology, energy, defence, ecology and humanism. As director general of the European Space Research Organization he was a leader in space research. || 
|-id=819
| 8819 Chrisbondi ||  || Christine Bondi (née Stockman; 1923), a British astrophysicist and mathematician and wife of Hermann Bondi, carried out research with Fred Hoyle in Cambridge on the internal constitution of stars and later taught mathematics at the Reigate Sixth Form College. Active in humanism, she served on the British Humanist Education Committee for many years. || 
|-id=820
| 8820 Anjandersen || 1985 VG || Anja C. Andersen (born 1965), a Danish astrophysicist, is an unusual combination of experimental, theoretical and observational work related to the properties and implications of dust particles. In 2005 she received the European Commission's Descartes Prize for outstanding excellence in science communication. || 
|-id=822
| 8822 Shuryanka ||  || Aleksandra Semenovna Morozova (born 1917), mother of the Ukrainian astronomer Lyudmila Karachkina, who discovered this minor planet. || 
|-id=824
| 8824 Genta || 1988 BH || Genta Yamamoto (born 1942), a Japanese potter, began creating pottery at the age of 20 and is known for his efforts to revive "Hoshino ware", one of the traditional pottery styles of Japan. His works have a motif that imitates heavenly bodies. Known in Japan as "The Man who bakes a planet", he is working on a design in the style of a "star". || 
|-id=826
| 8826 Corneville ||  || Corneville, a small village in Normandy. || 
|-id=827
| 8827 Kollwitz ||  || Käthe Kollwitz (1867–1945), a German graphic artist and sculptor. || 
|-id=829
| 8829 Buczkowski ||  || Debra L. Buczkowski (born 1969), a staff member at the Johns Hopkins University Applied Physics Laboratory. || 
|-id=831
| 8831 Brändström ||  || Elsa Brändström (1888–1948), a Swedish nurse and philanthropist, was the daughter of diplomat general Edvard Brändström. During World War I, she stood up beyond all measure for indigent German prisoners in Russia. || 
|-id=832
| 8832 Altenrath ||  || Henricus Hubertus Altenrath (1832–1892), initiator and first director of the "Nijverheidsschool", a well-known Antwerp school for the teaching of technical professions. Under his direction, the school began teaching in Flemish, which was not common at that time. His name is still honored by the Association "Henric Altenrath". The discoverer has taught for many years at this school. || 
|-id=833
| 8833 Acer || 1989 RW || Aceraceae, the maple family, with two genera and more than 100 species. One well-known species is Acer saccharum (sugar maple), the sap of which is used for maple syrup and maple sugar. || 
|-id=834
| 8834 Anacardium ||  || Anacardiaceae, the cashew or mango family, with 80 genera and over 800 species of evergreen and deciduous trees, shrubs and climbing plants. Anacardium occidentale (western cashew) yields a delicious fruit. || 
|-id=835
| 8835 Annona ||  || Annonaceae, the custard apple family, with more than 2000 species. The trees are mainly tropical and include the species Annona squamosa (sweetsop), which has a sweet, pulpy fruit. || 
|-id=836
| 8836 Aquifolium ||  || Aquifoliaceae, the holly family, with 700 evergreens and deciduous species. Ilex aquifolium (English holly) belongs to this family, as does Ilex paraguariensis (Yerba maté), which makes a tasteful tea. || 
|-id=837
| 8837 London ||  || London, UK || 
|-id=839
| 8839 Novichkova ||  || Vera Stepanovna Novichkova (born 1937), a Ukrainian doctor and hematologist, is the founder and head of the blood-transfusion station at Bakhchisaraj regional hospital in the Crimea. || 
|-id=842
| 8842 Bennetmcinnes || 1990 KF || Bennet McInnes (born 1929) was Secretary of the Royal Observatory, Edinburgh (1973–1987) and the Royal Observatory, Greenwich (1987–1989), and was involved in the establishment of the Isaac Newton Group of Telescopes in the Canary Islands. || 
|-id=847
| 8847 Huch ||  || Ricarda Huch (1864–1947), a German novelist and poet, and critic of the fascist regime. Born into a prosperous commercial family, she earned a doctorate in history in Zurich in 1891, afterwards working as a librarian and teacher. In 1897 she decided to become a writer. Her novels and stories depict historical figures and events. She was a critic of the fascist regime, and her last unfinished work was to portray the German resistance movement. In 1933, she retired from the Prussian Academy of Arts. Name proposed by the first discoverer, Freimut Börngen. || 
|-id=849
| 8849 Brighton ||  || Brighton, UK || 
|-id=850
| 8850 Bignonia ||  || Bignoniaceae, the catalpa family, with about 100 genera and 700 species with tubular flowers. Among them are Bignonia capreolata (trumpet flower) and Crescentia cujete (calabash). || 
|-id=852
| 8852 Buxus ||  || Buxaceae, the box family, with four or five genera and some 60 species of evergreen trees and shrubs. Buxus sempervirens (English boxwood) has very small leaves and is used for hedges and borders. || 
|-id=853
| 8853 Gerdlehmann ||  || Gerhard Lehmann (born 1960), a German amateur astronomer and discoverer of minor planets, who with Jens Kandler measured some 70 precise positions of minor planets and comets from photographic plates obtained at Drebach. Among the 1500 positions he has derived after switching to CCD equipment in 1994 are some for the 1998 opposition of this object. The Drebach positions have made more than 30 Tautenburg objects appropriate for numbering. A teacher of physics and astronomy, Lehmann is also a popularizer of astronomy and since 1997 the head of the minor planets section of the Vereinigung der Sternfreunde. || 
|-id=855
| 8855 Miwa || 1991 JL || Miwa Saito, a junior high school science teacher. She has made an effort to popularize science and astronomy on her World Wide Web site. || 
|-id=856
| 8856 Celastrus ||  || Celastraceae, the staff-tree family, with 100 genera and over 1000 species including many climbing plants. These include Celastrus scandens (bittersweet) and Euonymus europaeus (European spindle tree), the latter having pink fruit and orange seeds. || 
|-id=857
| 8857 Cercidiphyllum ||  || Cercidiphyllaceae, a family of plants with only one member, Cercidiphyllum japonicum (katsura tree), regarded as a plant of primitive origin. It was originally classified as belonging to the magnolias, but it seems more related to the planes. || 
|-id=858
| 8858 Cornus ||  || Cornaceae, known as dogwoods, a family of flowering plants, with about 12 genera and 100 species of evergreens, deciduous trees and shrubs. Species include Cornus sanguinea (red dogwood) and Cornus florida (flowering dogwood). || 
|-id=860
| 8860 Rohloff ||  || Ralf-Rainer Rohloff (born 1960), a design engineer on the staff of the Max-Planck-Institut für Astronomie. || 
|-id=861
| 8861 Jenskandler ||  || Jens Kandler, a German amateur astronomer. || 
|-id=862
| 8862 Takayukiota || 1991 UZ || Takayuki Ota, Japanese amateur astronomer || 
|-id=865
| 8865 Yakiimo || 1992 AF || Yakiimo, the observing station in Shizuoka prefecture, where this object was discovered. || 
|-id=866
| 8866 Tanegashima || 1992 BR || The island Tanegashima, southern Japan. || 
|-id=867
| 8867 Tubbiolo ||  || Andrew F. Tubbiolo is a multitalented engineer and enthusiast of space flight working at the University of Arizona's Lunar and Planetary Laboratory. He built some of the electronics on the successful Mars Pathfinder Lander and a complex interface for Spacewatch data acquisition. Discoverer of periodic comet P/2005 E1 (P/Tubbiolo). || 
|-id=868
| 8868 Hjorter ||  || Olof Hiorter (1696–1750), Swedish professor of astronomy at Uppsala in 1732–1737 and after 1746, independently discovered comet C/1743 X1 five days after Klinken-berg. With Celsius, he discovered the magnetic nature of aurorae. He donated his library to the Uppsala Observatory, and it is still the rarest part of that collection. || 
|-id=869
| 8869 Olausgutho ||  || Olaus Johannis Gutho (died 1516), was a Swedish student from the island of Gotland at Uppsala University from 1477 to 1486. His carefully written lecture notes (in seven volumes), the only ones preserved from that time, give good examples of the curricula in those days. || 
|-id=870
| 8870 von Zeipel ||  || Edvard Hugo von Zeipel (1873–1959), Swedish professor of astronomy at Uppsala University during 1911–1920, is still well known for his theoretical work in celestial mechanics and astrophysics. || 
|-id=871
| 8871 Svanberg ||  || Gustaf Svanberg (1802–1882), Swedish professor of astronomy at Uppsala University from 1842 to 1878, built the present building of Uppsala Astronomical Observatory and founded the meteorological observatory. His autobiography gives a good insight into the academic life in Uppsala during the nineteenth century. || 
|-id=872
| 8872 Ebenum ||  || Ebenaceae, a family of flowering plants in the ebony family, with only two genera and 500 species. Male and female flowers are usually borne on separate plants. The Diospyros genus dominates, the fruit of the Diospyros virginiana (persimmon) being good to eat. Diospyros ebenum (Macassar ebony) is a valuable wood. || 
|-id=874
| 8874 Showashinzan ||  || Showashinzan, a new volcanic mountain in Hokkaido that grew during 1943–1945. || 
|-id=875
| 8875 Fernie ||  || J. Donald Fernie (born 1933), professor emeritus of astronomy at the University of Toronto and former director of the David Dunlap Observatory, is known for his work on variable stars, galactic structure, photoelectric photometry, and the history of astronomy of the nineteenth and twentieth centuries. || 
|-id=877
| 8877 Rentaro ||  || Rentaro Taki (1879–1903), a Japan composer. After he finished his schooling in Japan he went to Germany and trained at the Music Academy in Leipzig. Not long afterward, however, he developed tuberculosis and returned to Japan to die. His songs, which include "The Moon over the Ruins of a Castle", are among the best loved in Japan. || 
|-id=881
| 8881 Prialnik ||  || Dina Prialnik, an Israeli astronomer, is a leading expert in the modeling of the thermal evolution of cometary nuclei. She is also known for her work on white dwarfs and the mechanisms of nova outbursts. || 
|-id=882
| 8882 Sakaetamura ||  || Sakae Tamura (born 1911), a founder of Gekkan Tenmon Guide ("Monthly Astronomy Guide") in 1965 and served as its chief editor until 1971. || 
|-id=883
| 8883 Miyazakihayao ||  || Hayao Miyazaki (born 1941), an animator and movie director. || 
|-id=885
| 8885 Sette ||  || Giancarlo Sette (born 1927), Italian amateur astronomer. || 
|-id=886
| 8886 Elaeagnus ||  || Elaeagnaceae, the oleaster family with three genera and about 50 species. In many species the flowers develop into edible fruits. Elaeagnus augustifolia (Russian olive) has important commercial value for its fruits. || 
|-id=887
| 8887 Scheeres ||  || Daniel J. Scheeres (born 1963), an American aerospace engineer in the Department of Aerospace Engineering and Engineering Mechanics at Iowa State University. He has pioneered the investigation of the dynamics of orbits close to small, irregularly shaped minor planets. His research has included studies of the short-term evolution and the long-term stability of orbits around radar-derived models of 4179 Toutatis and 4769 Castalia. His work has far-reaching implications for the operation of spacecraft orbiting minor planets, for the cosmogony of satellites of minor planets and for understanding the distribution of non-escaping impact ejecta on small bodies. || 
|-id=888
| 8888 Tartaglia ||  || Niccolò Fontana Tartaglia (1499–1557), an Italian mathematician, engineer and topographer. || 
|-id=889
| 8889 Mockturtle || 1994 OC || The Mock Turtle, character in Alice's Adventures in Wonderland. || 
|-id=890
| 8890 Montaigne ||  || Michel de Montaigne (1533–1592) was a French philosopher much preoccupied by the decline of intellectual optimism from the Renaissance through the Protestant Reformation. His Essays, intimate self-portraits advocating travel, reading and conversation, mark a new approach to literature. || 
|-id=891
| 8891 Irokawa ||  || Hiroshi Irokawa (born 1930), chief editor of Gekkan Tenmon Guide ("Monthly Astronomy Guide") from 1972 to 1974. || 
|-id=892
| 8892 Kakogawa ||  || Kakogawa, the city in the southwestern part of Hyogo prefecture. || 
|-id=895
| 8895 Nha || 1995 QN || Nha Il-Seong (born 1932), professor emeritus at Yonsei University, Korea, on the occasion of the dedication of his Museum of Astronomy in Yecheon. Professor Nha's major works include photometry of close binary stars, the discovery of the apsidal motion in the CW Cep system and contributions to the history of Asian astronomy. He has served as president of the Korean Astronomical Society and director of Yonsei University Observatory. Name proposed by the discoverer following a suggestion by K. Hurukawa. Citation by I. Hasegawa. || 
|-id=897
| 8897 Defelice || 1995 SX || Aurelio De Felice (1915–1996) was an Italian sculptor. || 
|-id=898
| 8898 Linnaea ||  || Linnaea Barton Keammerer (1980–1992) died in an accidental shooting. An avid student of nature, she was told while observing comet 1P/Halley in 1986 that she would almost certainly live to see it again. Linnaea enjoyed writing poetry: "One star silent in the sky, Twinkling, yet I don't know why.". || 
|-id=899
| 8899 Hughmiller ||  || Hugh Miller (1802–1856) was a pioneering Scottish geologist who made significant contributions to the study of fossils, especially in the Old Red Sandstone. With his publications he had a worldwide influence on professional science and its public understanding. His extensive collection was donated to the Royal Scottish Museum || 
|-id=900
| 8900 AAVSO ||  || AAVSO, the American Association of Variable Star Observers, one of the premier astronomical organizations, was founded in 1911 by amateur William Tyler Olcott, following Harvard astronomer Edward C. Pickering's prescient vision of a collaboration between amateurs and professionals in the name of science. || 
|}

8901–9000 

|-id=903
| 8903 Paulcruikshank ||  || Paul Shammim Cruikshank (1964–2015), an American-Afghan humorist and musician || 
|-id=904
| 8904 Yoshihara || 1995 VY || Masahiro Yoshihara (born 1928), of Yokkaichi, Japan, has been an amateur astronomer since 1942. From 1943 to 1951 he very actively observed variable stars. On 1946 Feb. 9 he was an independent discoverer of the outburst of the recurrent nova T Coronas Borealis. || 
|-id=905
| 8905 Bankakuko || 1995 WJ || Kakuko Ban (born 1967), Japanese staff member of the planetarium section of the Hiroshima Children's Museum. || 
|-id=906
| 8906 Yano ||  || Hajime Yano (born 1967), an expert in cosmic dust research and solar system exploration and a pioneer of in-situ studies of meteoroid and orbital debris in space. He also led the Japanese team for airborne observations of the 1998–2002 Leonid meteor storms and developed the sampling device for ISAS' MUSES-C mission. || 
|-id=907
| 8907 Takaji ||  || Takaji Kato (born 1947), an associate professor at the Institute of Space and Astronautical Science. || 
|-id=909
| 8909 Ohnishitaka ||  || Takafumi Ohnishi (born 1971), a systems engineer at Fujitsu Limited. || 
|-id=911
| 8911 Kawaguchijun || 1995 YA || Kawaguchi Jun'ichiro (born 1955), project manager of the MUSES-C mission, designed to deliver the world's first sample-and-return spacecraft. || 
|-id=912
| 8912 Ohshimatake ||  || Takeshi Oshima (born 1966) helped develop the MIC (Mars imaging camera) and SICPU (CPU board for science instruments) loaded on the first Japanese Mars exploration spacecraft "Nozomi". As a systems manager of NTSpace Ltd., he also helped develop the first Japanese sample-return Spacecraft, MUSES-C. || 
|-id=914
| 8914 Nickjames ||  || Nick James (born 1962), a leading CCD imager and photometrist who has produced large numbers of precision light curves of cataclysmic variables and images of unusual variables stars and comets. || 
|-id=915
| 8915 Sawaishujiro ||  || Shujiro Sawai (born 1966), an engineer in charge of the chemical propulsion system of MUSES-C, the Japanese sample-return mission. || 
|-id=917
| 8917 Tianjindaxue ||  || Tianjin University (Tianjindaxue), founded in 1895 as Peiyang University, is the oldest modern institution of higher education in China and has developed into one of the leading multidisciplinary research universities of the country, in engineering in particular. || 
|-id=919
| 8919 Ouyangziyuan ||  || Ouyang Ziyuan (born 1935) is a Chinese cosmochemist, geochemist and space advocate. As Chief Scientist for China's Lunar Exploration Program (LEP), he has been responsible for the development of the long-term strategic plans for China's LEP || 
|-id=922
| 8922 Kumanodake ||  || Zao Kumanodake, located between Miyagi and Yamagata prefectures in the northern part of mainland Japan, was designated as a national park in 1963. Mt. Kumanodake has a height of 1841 meters. || 
|-id=923
| 8923 Yamakawa ||  || Hiroshi Yamakawa (born 1965), an interplanetary trajectory and mission designer at ISAS. || 
|-id=924
| 8924 Iruma ||  || The Iruma area, Saitama prefecture, Japan. || 
|-id=925
| 8925 Boattini ||  || Andrea Boattini (born 1969). an Italian astronomer and discoverer of minor planets. After developing a growing interest in minor planets, he graduated in 1996 from the University of Bologna with a thesis on near-earth objects. He is involved in various projects related to NEO follow-up and search programs, with special interest in the NEO class known as Atens. He currently works at the Istituto di Astrofisica Spaziale of the National Research Council in Rome. The discoverers have started their astrometric activity on minor planets together with him.. || 
|-id=926
| 8926 Abemasanao || 1996 YK || Masanao Abe (born 1967), a planetary scientist at the Institute of Space and Astronautical Science. || 
|-id=927
| 8927 Ryojiro || 1996 YT || Ryojiro Akiba (born 1930), a professor of astronautics and former director-general of the Institute of Space and Astronautical Science. || 
|-id=929
| 8929 Haginoshinji ||  || Shinji Hagino (born 1959), an engineer who worked on the system design of Japanese scientific satellites such as HALCA (space VLBI satellite) and Akebono (aurora observation satellite). || 
|-id=930
| 8930 Kubota ||  || Takashi Kubota (born 1960) works on intelligent robotics exploration at the Institute of Space and Astronautical Science. He was engaged in developing guidance, navigation and control for touchdown and asteroidal surface exploration by a rover in the Hayabusa sample return mission from (25143) Itokawa. || 
|-id=931
| 8931 Hirokimatsuo ||  || Hiroki Matsuo, former director general at the Institute of Space and Astronautical Science. || 
|-id=932
| 8932 Nagatomo ||  || Makoto Nagatomo (born 1937), a pioneer in the field of electric propulsion. || 
|-id=933
| 8933 Kurobe ||  || The Kurobe ravine, in Toyama prefecture, is the largest and deepest in Japan. || 
|-id=934
| 8934 Nishimurajun ||  || Jun Nishimura (born 1927) works in the fields of cosmic-ray physics and space systems engineering, including scientific ballooning. He served as the director general of the Institute of Space and Astronautical Science between 1988 and 1992, when the Japanese government approved the development of the M-V rocket. || 
|-id=935
| 8935 Beccaria ||  || Cesare Beccaria (1738–1794) was an Italian Enlightenment thinker. In his most important work, Dei delitti e delle pene, Beccaria took sides against the death penalty, supporting the educational function of punishment. || 
|-id=936
| 8936 Gianni ||  || Gianni Ierman (born 1955), Italian amateur astronomer, who was the first member to join the Farra d´Isonzo observatory club in 1969. He was the owner of the first club telescope and was the club president in the 1980s || 
|-id=937
| 8937 Gassan ||  || Gassan, a volcanic mountain in central Yamagata prefecture. || 
|-id=939
| 8939 Onodajunjiro ||  || Junjiro Onoda (born 1946), director of the Mu-series satellite launcher program of the Institute of Space and Astronautical Science. || 
|-id=940
| 8940 Yakushimaru ||  || Hiroko Yakushimaru (born 1964), a Japanese actress and singer. || 
|-id=941
| 8941 Junsaito ||  || Jun Saito (born 1962), a Japan mineralogist and planetologist. || 
|-id=942
| 8942 Takagi ||  || Yasuhiko Takagi (born 1958), a Japanese planetary scientist, has investigated impact fragmentation phenomena and the origin of minor-planet families based on laboratory experiments. He also contributed to the Near-Infrared Spectrometer on board the Hayabusa spacecraft. || 
|-id=943
| 8943 Stefanozavka ||  || Stefano Zafka (1972–2007), was an Italian Alpine guide from Terni. He also took part in two expeditions on K2. After reaching the Himalayan peak for the second time he disappeared during the descent. || 
|-id=944
| 8944 Ortigara ||  || Mount Ortigara, located near the Asiago Astrophysical Observatory, is one of the highest peaks in the Asiago Tableland and was the location of one of the most famous and bloodiest alpine battles of World War I. || 
|-id=945
| 8945 Cavaradossi || 1997 CM || Cavaradossi, character in Puccini's opera Tosca. A revolutionary and fighter against despotism, Cavaradossi is imprisoned and condemned to die. || 
|-id=946
| 8946 Yoshimitsu || 1997 CO || Tetsuo Yoshimitsu (born 1970) works on research and development of planetary rovers and is the chief engineer of the asteroid surface explorer MINERVA for the Hayabusa mission. The novel technology resulting from his studies of mobile systems on minor-planet surfaces in a microgravity environment was installed in MINERVA. || 
|-id=947
| 8947 Mizutani ||  || Hitoshi Mizutani (born 1944) works mainly on the origin and evolution of the solar system and internal structures of planets. He has been a professor at the Institute of Space and Astronautical Science and played a leading role in Japanese lunar and planetary exploration. || 
|-id=952
| 8952 ODAS ||  || ODAS, the OCA-DLR Asteroid Survey, operated the first and only quasiautomatic European near-Earth-asteroid search program from 1996 to 1999. Five NEAs, ten Mars-crossers and a comet were discovered in the course of this survey. ODAS also produced more than 44~000 astrometric positions of 2200 new minor planets. || 
|-id=954
| 8954 Baral ||  || Jessika Baral (born 1999) is a finalist in the 2012 Broadcom MASTERS, a math and science competition for middle-school students, for her biochemistry, medicine, health science, and microbiology project. || 
|-id=957
| 8957 Koujounotsuki ||  || Koujounotsuki, musical piece composed by Rentaro Taki. || 
|-id=958
| 8958 Stargazer ||  || This name honors in general those who since time immemorial have gazed up at the night sky in wonderment. It honors in particular the noble pursuit of amateur astronomy. || 
|-id=959
| 8959 Oenanthe || 2550 P-L || The wheatear, or Oenanthe oenanthe. || 
|-id=960
| 8960 Luscinioides || 2575 P-L || The Savi's warbler, or Locustella luscinioides. || 
|-id=961
| 8961 Schoenobaenus || 2702 P-L || The sedge warbler, or Acrocephalus schoenobaenus. || 
|-id=962
| 8962 Noctua || 2771 P-L || The little owl, or Athene noctua. || 
|-id=963
| 8963 Collurio || 4651 P-L || The red-backed shrike, or Lanius collurio. || 
|-id=964
| 8964 Corax || 7643 P-L || The raven, or Corvus corax. || 
|-id=965
| 8965 Citrinella || 9511 P-L || The yellowhammer, or Emberiza citrinella. || 
|-id=966
| 8966 Hortulana || 3287 T-1 || The ortolan bunting, or Emberiza hortulana. || 
|-id=967
| 8967 Calandra || 4878 T-1 || The corn bunting, or Miliaria calandra. || 
|-id=968
| 8968 Europaeus || 1212 T-2 || The nightjar, or Caprimulgus europaeus. || 
|-id=969
| 8969 Alexandrinus || 1218 T-2 || The Kentish plover, or Charadrius alexandrinus. || 
|-id=970
| 8970 Islandica || 1355 T-2 || The Barrow's goldeneye, or Bucephala islandica. || 
|-id=971
| 8971 Leucocephala || 2256 T-2 || The white-headed duck, or Oxyura leucocephala. || 
|-id=972
| 8972 Sylvatica || 2319 T-2 || The Andalusian hemipode, or Turnix sylvatica. || 
|-id=973
| 8973 Pratincola || 3297 T-2 || The wading bird Glareola pratincola, or collared pratincole. || 
|-id=974
| 8974 Gregaria || 3357 T-2 || The sociable plover, or Chettusia gregaria. || 
|-id=975
| 8975 Atthis || 4076 T-2 || The kingfisher, or Alcedo atthis. || 
|-id=976
| 8976 Leucura || 4221 T-2 || The black wheatear, or Oenanthe leucura. || 
|-id=977
| 8977 Paludicola || 4272 T-2 || The aquatic warbler, or Acrocephalus paludicola. || 
|-id=978
| 8978 Barbatus || 3109 T-3 || The lammergeier, or Gypaetus barbatus. || 
|-id=979
| 8979 Clanga || 3476 T-3 || The greater spotted eagle, or Aquila clanga. || 
|-id=980
| 8980 Heliaca || 4190 T-3 || The imperial eagle, or Aquila heliaca. || 
|-id=982
| 8982 Oreshek ||  || Oreshek, an ancient Russian fortress built in 1323. || 
|-id=983
| 8983 Rayakazakova ||  || Raisa Konstantinovna Kazakova, a celestial mechanician at the Keldysh Institute of Applied Mathematics. || 
|-id=984
| 8984 Derevyanko ||  || Tatiana Timofeevna Derevyanko, a cinema-artist and director of the Dovzhenko Museum at the Dovzhenko Film Studio in Kiev. || 
|-id=985
| 8985 Tula ||  || Tula, a city in Russian Federation, the administrative focus of the region and prominent industrial and cultural center. || 
|-id=986
| 8986 Kineyayasuyo ||  || Yasuyo Kineya, elder sister of Japanese astronomer Kōichirō Tomita, who discovered this minor planet. || 
|-id=987
| 8987 Cavancuddy ||  || Cavan Michael Cuddy (born 1981) is the "System Design Lead" and "Spacecraft Responsible Systems Engineer" of the Lucy mission. || 
|-id=990
| 8990 Compassion || 1980 DN || Compassion – named to honor the victims of the September 11 attacks || 
|-id=991
| 8991 Solidarity ||  || Solidarity – named to honor the victims of the September 11 attacks || 
|-id=992
| 8992 Magnanimity ||  || Magnanimity – named to honor the victims of the September 11 attacks || 
|-id=993
| 8993 Ingstad || 1980 UL || Helge Ingstad (1899–2001), was a Norwegian pioneer explorer and archeologist. Foremost among his many achievements was his and his wife's discovery of remains from the Viking settlements on Newfoundland. This proved that the Vikings reached North America, probably as the first Europeans. || 
|-id=994
| 8994 Kashkashian || 1980 VG || Kim Kashkashian (born 1952), an Armenian-American classical violist. She is known for her particular empathy with the works of composers of the late-twentieth century. || 
|-id=995
| 8995 Rachelstevenson ||  || Rachel Stevenson (born 1984), a postdoctoral fellow at the Jet Propulsion Laboratory. || 
|-id=996
| 8996 Waynedwards ||  || Wayne N. Edwards (born 1977), a research scientist with the Canadian Hazards Information Service. || 
|-id=997
| 8997 Davidblewett ||  || David T. Blewett (born 1959), a senior staff member at the Johns Hopkins University Applied Physics Laboratory. || 
|-id=998
| 8998 Matthewizawa ||  || Matthew Richard Mitsuomi Izawa (born 1979), a postdoctoral researcher at the University of Winnipeg. || 
|-id=999
| 8999 Tashadunn ||  || Tasha L. Dunn (born 1978), a professor in the Department of Geology at Colby College. || 
|-id=000
| 9000 Hal || 1981 JO || HAL 9000, fictional computer in Space Odyssey series || 
|}

References 

008001-009000